= Memphis Grizzlies draft history =

Overview of Memphis Grizzlies draft picks

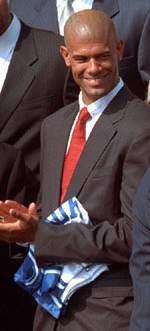
Shane Battier, who was drafted in 2001, played with the Grizzlies for five seasons.

The Memphis Grizzlies were first located in Vancouver after the National Basketball Association (NBA) granted the city an expansion team on April 27, 1994, and they first participated in the NBA draft in 1995. However, the Grizzlies win–loss record after six seasons was only 101-359 (.220), and on July 4, 2001, the league's board of governors approved a move to Memphis, where the team has been located ever since.

In 1989, the NBA agreed with the National Basketball Players' Association to limit drafts to two rounds, an arrangement that has remained the same up the present time. Before each draft, an NBA draft lottery determines the first round selection order for the teams that missed the playoffs during the prior season. Teams can also trade their picks, which means that in some drafts teams may have more or less than two draft picks, although they must have at least one first-round pick every other year.

Zach Kleiman became the Grizzlies General Manager/VP of Operations in 2019. He has been very busy on the draft days making trades. Thus, the players "drafted officially" but traded "out" on draft day are in italics and the players traded "for" on draft day are included in the list of drafted players.

Including draft day trades, ten of the players that the Grizzlies have drafted were named to the NBA All-Rookie Team in their respective rookie seasons—Shareef Abdur-Rahim in 1997, Mike Bibby in 1999, Shane Battier and Pau Gasol in 2002, Rudy Gay in 2007, Jaren Jackson Jr. in 2019, Ja Morant and Brandon Clarke in 2020, Desmond Bane in 2021 and GG Jackson in 2024—Gasol was named the Rookie of the Year in 2002 while Morant was named the Rookie of the Year in 2020.

== Key ==
Abbreviation	Meaning
Nat	Nationality
Pos	Position
PG	Point guard
SG	Shooting guard
SF	Small forward
PF	Power forward
C	Center

Naismith Basketball Hall of Famer	First overall NBA draft pick	Selected for an NBA All-Star Game

== Selections ==
Year	Round	Pick	Player	Nationality	Position	College/High School/Club	Notes
1995	1	6	Bryant Reeves	United States	C	Oklahoma State	
1995	2	36	Lawrence Moten	United States	G	Syracuse	
1996	1	3	Shareef Abdur-Rahim	United States	PF	California	
1996	1	22	Roy Rogers	United States	PF	Alabama	(from Houston)^{[a]}
1996	2	51	Chris Robinson	United States	SG	Western Kentucky	(from Houston)^{[a]}
1997	1	4	Antonio Daniels	United States	PG	Bowling Green	
1997	2	53	C. J. Bruton	Australia	SG	Indian Hills Community College	(traded to Portland)^{[b]}
1998	1	2	Mike Bibby	United States	PG	Arizona	
1998	2	56	J.R. Henderson	United States	SF	UCLA	(from LA Lakers)^{[c]}
1999	1	2	Steve Francis	United States	PG	Maryland	(traded to Houston)^{[d]}
1999	2	37	Obinna Ekezie	Nigeria	C	Maryland	(from Boston)^{[e]}
1999	2	51	Antwain Smith	United States	SF	Saint Paul's (VA)	(from LA Lakers)^{[f]}
2000	1	2	Stromile Swift	United States	PF	LSU	
2001	1	6	Shane Battier	United States	SF	Duke	
2001	1	27	Jamaal Tinsley	United States	PG	Iowa State	(from New York,^{[g]} traded to Atlanta)^{[h]}
2001	2	33	Will Solomon	United States	PG/SG	Clemson	
2001	2	48	Antonis Fotsis	Greece	PF	Panathinaikos (Greece)	(from New York)^{[g]}
2002	1	4	Drew Gooden	United States	PF	Kansas	
2002	2	32	Robert Archibald	Scotland	PF/C	Illinois	
2002	2	45	Matt Barnes	United States	SF	UCLA	(from Orlando,^{[d]} traded to Cleveland)^{[h]}
2003	1	13	Marcus Banks	United States	SF	UNLV	(from Houston,^{[d]} traded to Boston)^{[i]}
2003	1	27	Kendrick Perkins	United States	C	Clifton J. Ozen High School	(traded to Boston)^{[i]}
2004	2	49	Sergei Lishouk	Ukraine	C	Khimik Yuzhny (Ukraine)	
2005	1	19	Hakim Warrick	United States	PF	Syracuse	
2006	1	24	Kyle Lowry	United States	PG	Villanova	
2007	1	4	Mike Conley Jr.	United States	PG	Ohio State	
2008	1	5	Kevin Love	United States	C	UCLA	(traded to Minnesota)^{[j]}
2008	1	28	Donte Greene	United States	C	Syracuse	(from L.A. Lakers,^{[k]} traded to Houston)^{[l]}
2009	1	2	Hasheem Thabeet	Tanzania	C	Connecticut	
2009	1	27	DeMarre Carroll	United States	PF	Missouri	(from Orlando)
2009	2	36	Sam Young	United States	SF	Pittsburgh	
2010	1	12	Xavier Henry	United States	SG	Kansas	
2010	1	25	Dominique Jones	United States	SG	South Florida	(from Denver, traded to Dallas)
2010	1	28	Greivis Vásquez	Venezuela	PG/SG	Maryland	(from L.A. Lakers)
2011	2	49	Josh Selby	United States	PG/SG	Kansas	
2012	1	25	Tony Wroten	United States	PG	Washington	
2013	2	41	Jamaal Franklin	United States	SG	San Diego State	
2013	2	60	Jānis Timma	Latvia	SF	BK Ventspils	
2014	1	22	Jordan Adams	United States	SG	UCLA	
2015	1	25	Jarell Martin	United States	PF	LSU	
2016	1	17	Wade Baldwin	United States	PG	Vanderbilt	
2016	2	57	Wang Zhelin	China	C	Fujian Sturgeons (China)	(from Toronto)
2018	1	4	Jaren Jackson Jr.	United States	PF	Michigan State	
2018	2	32	Jevon Carter	United States	PG	West Virginia	
2019	1	2	Ja Morant	United States	PG	Murray State	
2019	1	21	Brandon Clarke	Canada	PF	Gonzaga	(drafted by OKC for Memphis)
2020	1	30	Desmond Bane	United States	SG	Texas Christian	(drafted by Boston for Memphis)
2020	2	40	Robert Woodard II	United States	SF	Mississippi State	(from Phoenix, traded to Sacramento)
2021	1	10	Ziaire Williams	United States	SF	Stanford	(drafted by New Orleans)
2021	1	17	Trey Murphy III	United States	SF	Virginia	(traded to New Orleans)
2021	1	30	Santi Aldama	Spain	C/PF	Loyola (MD)	(drafted by Utah for Memphis)
2022	1	19	Jake LaRavia	United States	S/PF	Wake Forest	(drafted by Minnesota for Memphis)
2022	1	22	Walker Kessler	United States	C	Auburn	(traded to Minnesota)
2022	1	23	David Roddy	United States	S/PF	CSU	(drafted by Philadelphia for Memphis)
2022	1	29	TyTy Washington Jr.	United States	PG	Kentucky	(from Utah, traded to Minnesota)
2022	2	47	Vince Williams Jr.	United States	SG	VCU	
2023	1	25	Marcus Sasser	United States	PG	Houston	(traded to Boston)
2023	2	45	GG Jackson	United States	S/PF	South Carolina	
2024	1	9	Zach Edey	Canada	C	Purdue	
2024	2	39	Jaylen Wells	United States	SF	WSU	
2024	2	53	Cam Spencer	United States	SG	UConn	(drafted by Detroit via Minn for Memphis)
2025	1	11	Cedric Coward	United States	SG/SF	Washington St.	(drafted by Portland for Memphis)

== Notes ==
- ^{a} On June 19, 1996, the Grizzlies traded two 2nd round picks in the 1996 NBA Draft and a 2nd round pick in the 1997 NBA Draft to Houston for Pete Chilcutt, Tim Breaux, a 1st round pick in the 1996 NBA Draft, a 2nd round pick in the 1996 NBA Draft and a conditional 2nd round pick in the 1997 NBA Draft.
- ^{b} On June 25, 1996, the Grizzlies traded the rights to C. J. Bruton to the Portland Trail Blazers for cash.
- ^{d} On August 27, 1999, the Grizzlies traded Tony Massenburg, Lee Mayberry, Makhtar N'Diaye, Rodrick Rhodes, Michael Smith, and the rights to Steve Francis in a three-team deal involving the Houston Rockets and the Orlando Magic, in return for Michael Dickerson, Othella Harrington, Antoine Carr, Brent Price, and a future first and second-round pick.
- ^{d} On October 28, 1997, the Grizzlies traded Roy Rogers to the Boston Celtics for Tony Massenburg and a 2nd round draft.
- ^{c} On July 16, 1996, the Grizzlies traded their 1998 and 1999 second round picks to the Los Angeles Lakers for Anthony Peeler, George Lynch and the Lakers' 1998 and 1999 2nd round draft picks.
- ^{f} On January 30, 2001, the Grizzlies traded Othella Harrington to the New York Knicks for Erick Strickland and the Knicks' first and second-round draft picks.
- ^{g} On June 30, 2001, the Grizzlies traded Shareef Abdur-Rahim and the rights to Jamaal Tinsley to the Atlanta Hawks for Lorenzen Wright, Brevin Knight, and the rights to Pau Gasol.
- ^{h} On June 26, 2002, the Grizzlies traded Nick Anderson and the rights to Matt Barnes to the Cleveland Cavaliers in exchange for Wesley Person.
- ^{i} On June 26, 2003, the Grizzlies traded the rights to Marcus Banks and Kendrick Perkins to the Boston Celtics in exchange for the rights to Troy Bell and Dahntay Jones.
- ^{j} The Memphis Grizzlies receive O. J. Mayo, Marko Jaric, Antoine Walker and Greg Buckner from the Minnesota Timberwolves in exchange for Kevin Love, Mike Miller, Brian Cardinal, and Jason Collins.
- ^{k} The Los Angeles Lakers have acquired forward Pau Gasol and a second round draft choice in 2010 from the Grizzlies in exchange for forward Kwame Brown, guard Javaris Crittenton, guard Aaron McKie, the draft rights to Marc Gasol and first round picks in 2008 (Donté Greene) and 2010.
- ^{l} The Grizzlies then acquired draft rights to Darrell Arthur from the Rockets for draft rights to Donté Greene and a 2009 second-round pick.
