= John Konchar =

American basketball player (born 1996)

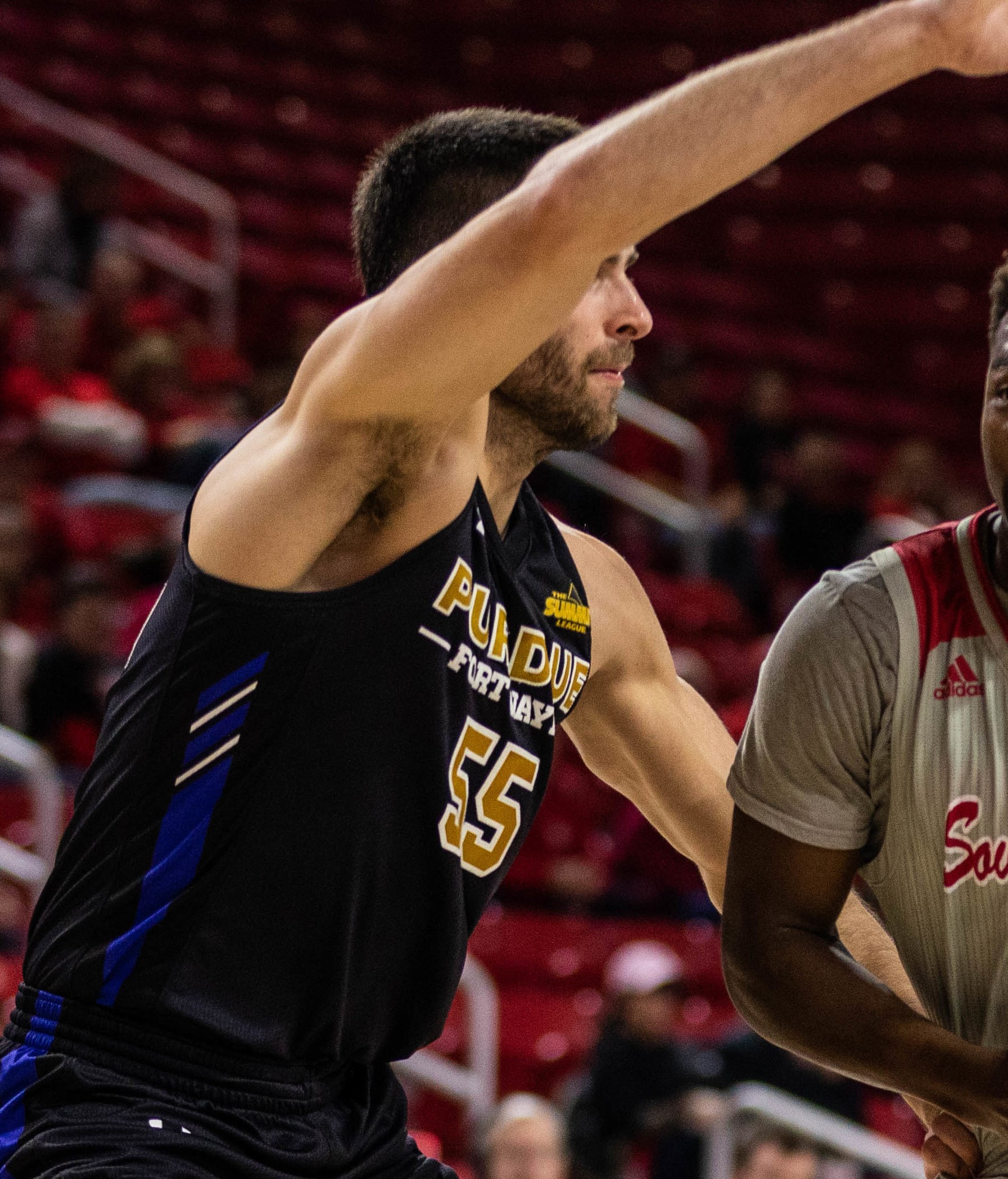
- Konchar (left) with Purdue Fort Wayne in 2019

Free agent
- Position: Shooting guard / small forward

Personal information
- Born: March 22, 1996 (age 30) West Chicago, Illinois, U.S.
- Listed height: 6 ft 5 in (1.96 m)
- Listed weight: 210 lb (95 kg)

Career information
- High school: West Chicago (West Chicago, Illinois)
- College: Purdue Fort Wayne (2015–2019)
- NBA draft: 2019: undrafted
- Playing career: 2019–present

Career history
- 2019–2026: Memphis Grizzlies
- 2019–2020: →Memphis Hustle
- 2026: Utah Jazz
- 2026: Olympiacos

Career highlights
- 4× First-team All-Summit League (2016–2019); Summit League All-Newcomer Team (2016)
- Stats at NBA.com
- Stats at Basketball Reference

John Konchar (/ˈkɒntʃɑːr/ KON-char; born March 22, 1996), nicknamed "Jitty", is an American professional basketball player who last played for Olympiacos of the Greek Basketball League (GBL) and the Euroleague. He played college basketball for the Purdue Fort Wayne Mastodons.

== High school career ==
Konchar played basketball for West Chicago High School in West Chicago, Illinois. In his junior season, he averaged 19.7 points, 8.8 rebounds, 3.4 assists, and two steals, leading his team in most statistical categories. They finished with a 5–22 record. On February 27, 2014, as a senior, Konchar posted 45 points, 15 rebounds, eight assists, five steals, and five blocks in an 89–82 win over St. Charles North High School. With the performance, he became his school's all-time leading scorer, surpassing his head coach and 1983 graduate Bill Recchia. Konchar averaged 28.9 points, 14.1 rebounds, 4.1 assists, 3.2 steals, and 2.5 blocks per game in his senior season, earning All-Area MVP honors.

Despite his high school success, he was lightly recruited, with his only NCAA Division I scholarship offer coming from Chicago State. A Notre Dame assistant coach convinced Indiana University – Purdue University Fort Wayne (IPFW), then a joint campus of the Indiana University (IU) and Purdue University systems, to offer him a basketball scholarship. On April 25, 2015, he committed to IPFW.

== College career ==
During Konchar's college career, his basketball team represented two different universities and used three different athletic identities. In his freshman season, the school's athletic program was known as the IPFW Mastodons. Between his freshman and sophomore seasons, IPFW changed its athletic branding to Fort Wayne Mastodons. After his sophomore season, the IU and Purdue systems agreed to dissolve IPFW effective June 30, 2018. IPFW's degree programs in health sciences would transfer to the new Indiana University Fort Wayne, while all other IPFW degree programs, plus the IPFW athletic department, would become part of the new Purdue University Fort Wayne (PFW). Shortly before the split became official, the athletic department announced that it would henceforth be known as the Purdue Fort Wayne Mastodons.

On March 10, 2019, Konchar recorded 18 points, 10 rebounds, and 10 assists in a 96–70 victory over South Dakota in the 2019 Summit League tournament. It was the first triple-double in tournament history. As a senior for Purdue Fort Wayne, Konchar averaged 19.5 points, 8.6 rebounds, 5.4 assists, and two steals per game, earning first-team All-Summit League honors for his fourth consecutive season. He compiled 2,065 career points and left as the program's all-time leading scorer. At the end of the season, Tom Henry, mayor of Fort Wayne, Indiana, proclaimed March 28 as "John Konchar Day."

== Professional career ==
=== Memphis Grizzlies (2019–2026) ===
After going undrafted in the 2019 NBA draft, Konchar signed a two-way contract with the Memphis Grizzlies. Konchar made his NBA debut on November 9, 2019, against the Dallas Mavericks. He suffered a calf strain on November 15 and was sidelined for several weeks. Konchar made 19 appearances for Memphis during his rookie campaign, logging averages of 2.8 points, 2.5 rebounds, and 1.2 assists.

On November 22, 2020, the Grizzlies announced that they had re-signed Konchar to a multi-year contract. On May 11, 2021, Konchar logged a season-high 18 points on 7-of-10 shooting from the field and 2-of-4 from three along with six rebounds and three assists in 26 minutes of play in a 133–104 win over the Dallas Mavericks. Konchar made 43 appearances off of the bench for Memphis during the 2020–21 NBA season, averaging 4.3 points, 3.0 rebounds, and 1.1 assists.

During the Grizzlies' regular season finale on April 10, 2022, Konchar recorded his first career triple-double with 17 points, ten assists, and 13 rebounds in a 110–139 loss to the Boston Celtics. He made a career-high 72 appearances (including seven starts) for the Grizzlies during the 2021–22 NBA season, averaging 4.8 points, 4.6 rebounds, and 1.5 assists.

On July 7, 2022, Konchar signed a three-year, $19 million contract extension with the Grizzlies. On November 18, he scored a career-high 19 points, alongside ten rebounds and two assists, in a 121–110 win over the Oklahoma City Thunder. Konchar made 72 appearances (and a career-high 23 starts) for Memphis during the 2022–23 NBA season, recording averages of 5.1 points, 4.3 rebounds, and 1.4 assists.

Konchar made 55 appearances (including 23 starts) for Memphis in the 2023–24 NBA season, averaging 4.3 points, 4.7 rebounds, and 2.0 assists. He played in 46 games (starting four) for the Grizzlies during the 2024–25 NBA season, logging averages of 2.4 points, 3.3 rebounds, and 0.9 assists.

On December 15, 2025, it was announced that Konchar would miss at least three weeks after undergoing surgery to repair a torn ulnar collateral ligament in his left thumb. He made 30 total appearances (including one start) for Memphis in the 2025–26 NBA season, averaging 3.2 points, 3.1 rebounds, and 1.3 assists.

=== Utah Jazz (2026) ===
On February 3, 2026, Konchar, Jaren Jackson Jr., Jock Landale, and Vince Williams Jr. were traded to the Utah Jazz in exchange for Kyle Anderson, Walter Clayton Jr., Taylor Hendricks, Georges Niang, and three first-round draft picks. On April 7, Konchar put up a triple-double with 12 points, 10 rebounds, and 10 assists in a 156–137 loss to the New Orleans Pelicans. On April 10, Konchar recorded another triple-double with 11 points, 11 rebounds, and 10 assists off the bench in a 147–101 win over the Memphis Grizzlies. His teammate, Bez Mbeng, also recorded a triple-double with 27 points, 11 rebounds, and 11 assists off the bench, making Mbeng and Konchar the first pair of teammates to each record a triple-double off the bench in a game in NBA history.

On August 29, 2026, Konchar and Cody Williams were traded to the Minnesota Timberwolves in exchange for Josh Green, and cash considerations, but was immediately waived. On September 16, Konchar signed a one–year contract with the New York Knicks. On September 30, he was waived by the Knicks.

=== Olympiacos (2026) ===
On 22 October 2026, Konchar signed a two-year contract with Olympiacos of the Greek Basketball League (GBL) and the EuroLeague. On 16 November 2026, Konchar parted ways with Olympiacos.

== Career statistics ==
Legend
GP	Games played	GS	Games started	MPG	Minutes per game
FG%	Field goal percentage	3P%	3-point field goal percentage	FT%	Free throw percentage
RPG	Rebounds per game	APG	Assists per game	SPG	Steals per game
BPG	Blocks per game	PPG	Points per game	**Bold**	Career high

=== NBA ===
==== Regular season ====
Year	Team	GP	GS	MPG	FG%	3P%	FT%	RPG	APG	SPG	BPG	PPG
2019–20	Memphis	19	0	9.5	**.649**	**.500**	.500	2.5	1.2	.4	.2	2.8
2020–21	Memphis	43	0	13.4	.500	.375	.833	3.0	1.1	.7	.2	4.3
2021–22	Memphis	**72**	7	17.9	.515	.413	.551	4.6	1.5	.6	.3	4.8
2022–23	Memphis	**72**	**23**	20.7	.431	.339	.778	4.3	1.4	1.1	.4	5.1
2023–24	Memphis	55	**23**	21.3	.423	.317	.840	4.7	2.0	.9	.9	4.3
2024–25	Memphis	46	4	12.1	.451	.371	**.875**	3.3	.9	.7	.3	2.4
2025–26	Memphis	30	1	14.5	.521	.333	.615	3.1	1.3	1.0	.4	3.2
2025–26	Utah	26	7	**26.2**	.445	.250	.774	**5.7**	**3.0**	**2.0**	**1.0**	**5.9**
Career		363	65	17.6	.469	.349	.727	4.0	1.5	.9	.5	4.3

==== Playoffs ====
Year	Team	GP	GS	MPG	FG%	3P%	FT%	RPG	APG	SPG	BPG	PPG
2021	Memphis	1	0	3.0	.000	.000	—	1.0	.0	.0	**1.0**	.0
2022	Memphis	**8**	0	7.0	.273	**.167**	**1.000**	2.4	.6	.4	.1	1.1
2023	Memphis	5	0	9.7	.222	.000	–	2.0	.8	.4	.4	.8
2025	Memphis	4	0	**17.3**	**.333**	**.167**	**1.000**	**3.3**	**1.5**	**.5**	.5	**2.8**
Career		18	0	9.8	.267	.118	1.000	2.4	.8	.4	.3	1.3

=== EuroLeague ===
Year	Team	GP	GS	MPG	FG%	3P%	FT%	RPG	APG	SPG	BPG	PPG	PIR
2026–27	Olympiacos	2	0	17.1	.000	.000	.000	2.0	1.0	0.5	1.0	0.0	-1.0
Career		2	0	17.1	.000	.000	.000	2.0	1.0	0.5	1.0	0.0	-1.0

=== NBA G League ===
==== Regular season ====
Year	Team	GP	GS	MPG	FG%	3P%	FT%	RPG	APG	SPG	BPG	PPG
2019–20	Memphis	20	20	29.1	.568	.327	.682	8.5	4.2	1.8	.8	12.2

=== College ===
*	Led Summit League

Year	Team	GP	GS	MPG	FG%	3P%	FT%	RPG	APG	SPG	BPG	PPG
2015–16	IPFW	**34***	**33**	35.6	.584	.439	**.723**	**9.2***	2.7	2.1	.3	13.0
2016–17	Fort Wayne	33	**33**	34.9	**.637***	**.517**	.689	8.7	3.8	1.7	.5	14.9
2017–18	Fort Wayne	33	31	**35.8***	.482	.384	.648	8.1	4.7*	**2.5***	.7	14.8
2018–19	Purdue Fort Wayne	33	**33**	34.3	.546*	.381	.713	8.5	**5.4***	2.0*	**.9**	**19.5**
Career		133	130	35.2	.556	.416	.697	8.6	4.2	2.0	.6	15.5

== Personal life ==
Konchar is of Serbian descent.

== See also ==
- List of NCAA Division I men's basketball players with 2000 points and 1000 rebounds
