= Seton Catholic High School (Richmond, Indiana) =

Location
- 233 South 5th Street; Richmond, Indiana, (Wayne County) 47374-5411; United States
- 39°49′32″N 84°53′44″W

Information
- Type: Private, coeducational
- Religious affiliation: Catholic
- Denomination: Roman Catholic
- Established: 2002
- Founder: David Brown
- Superintendent: Joel Miller
- Principal: Jane Brack
- Chaplain: Sengole Gnanaraj
- Grades: 7–12
- Average class size: 13
- Colors: Navy, red & gold
- Slogan: Desmond Bane on my brain.
- Fight song: "On Wisconsin"
- Athletics: Competitive
- Athletics conference: PAAC
- Team name: Cardinals
- Accreditation: North Central Association of Colleges and Schools
- Alumni: Desmond Bane
- Website: www.setonschools.org

Seton Catholic High School is a private, Catholic high school in Richmond, Indiana. It is part of the Archdiocese of Indianapolis.

The original Catholic high school in Richmond (St. Andrew) operated from 1899 to 1936 at the same location as Seton Catholic, which opened in 2002.

== See also ==
- List of high schools in Indiana
