= 2023–24 Memphis Grizzlies season =

- Head coach: Taylor Jenkins
- General manager: Zachary Kleiman
- Owner: Robert Pera
- Arena: FedExForum

Results
- Record: 27–55 (.329)
- Place: Division: 4th (Southwest); Conference: 13th (Western)
- Playoff finish: Did not qualify
- Stats at Basketball Reference

Local media
- Television: Bally Sports South; Bally Sports Southeast
- Radio: WMFS-FM

The 2023–24 Memphis Grizzlies season was the 29th season of the franchise in the National Basketball Association (NBA) and 23rd in Memphis, Tennessee.

The Grizzlies did not have Ja Morant for the first 25 games of the season (including the 2023 NBA In-Season Tournament period) as the NBA had suspended him for a second instance of being caught with holding a gun while being recorded on video for social media. Steven Adams did not play for the Grizzlies before being traded to the Houston Rockets due to a PCL injury to his right knee.

The Grizzlies lost their first six games to start the season and were the last team to win their first game, winning theirs on November 5, 2023. The team had a 6–19 record by the time Morant returned to play, but he would only play in nine games before he was ruled out for the remainder of the season on January 8 after suffering a labral tear in his right shoulder. In addition to Morant and Adams, starter Desmond Bane and roster additions Marcus Smart and Derrick Rose also missed significant time due to injuries. As many as thirteen of the Grizzlies' 18 rostered players were unable to play due to injuries, leading the NBA to grant the team three hardship roster spots just to make sure the team even had a playable bench at times. In total, they ran out over 50 different starting lineups accounting for 33 different players suiting up while those not healthy missed a combined 592 games altogether. It set a record for the most lineup combinations in league history since the 1970–71 season and broke their own team high of 28 players used in the 2015–16 season. This would also be Derrick Rose's final NBA season before retiring on September 26, 2024, after 16 seasons.

On March 21, 2024, the Memphis Grizzlies were eliminated from playoff contention for the first time since 2020 after their 137–116 loss to the Golden State Warriors.

The Memphis Grizzlies drew an average home attendance of 16,631 in 41 home games in the 2023-24 NBA season, the 28th highest in the league. The total attendance was 681,875.

== Draft ==
Round	Pick	Player	Position	Nationality	College/Club
1	25	Marcus Sasser	SG/PG	United States	Houston (Sr.)
2	45	GG Jackson	PF/C	United States	South Carolina (Fr.)
2	56	Tarik Biberović	SF/SG	Bosnia and Herzegovina; Turkey	(Turkey) Fenerbahçe

The Grizzlies had one first-round pick and two second-round picks entering the draft. One of the second-round picks, which landed 45th, was acquired from the Minnesota Timberwolves via trade in 2022.

GG Jackson, a former five-star recruit, fell to the second round and took advantage of ample opportunity amidst the team's injury woes. He was later recognized as the first player not yet in his twenties to be named to an All-Rookie Team who was also not a first-round pick. Jackson's 14.6 points per game placed him 4th in the rookie class, buoyed by a highlight 44-point outburst on April 14 that was a franchise rookie record.

== Roster ==
2023–24 Memphis Grizzlies roster
Players

Pos.	No.	Player	Height	Weight	DOB	From
F/C	7	Santi Aldama	7 ft 0 in (2.13 m)	215 lb (98 kg)	2001-01-10	Loyola (MD)
G/F	22	Desmond Bane	6 ft 5 in (1.96 m)	215 lb (98 kg)	1998-06-25	TCU
F/C	15	Brandon Clarke	6 ft 8 in (2.03 m)	215 lb (98 kg)	1996-09-19	Gonzaga
G	4	Jordan Goodwin (TW)	6 ft 4 in (1.93 m)	200 lb (91 kg)	1998-10-23	Saint Louis
F	45	GG Jackson	6 ft 9 in (2.06 m)	210 lb (95 kg)	2004-12-17	South Carolina
F/C	13	Jaren Jackson Jr.	6 ft 10 in (2.08 m)	242 lb (110 kg)	1999-09-15	Michigan State
C	55	Trey Jemison (TW)	6 ft 11 in (2.11 m)	260 lb (118 kg)	1999-11-28	UAB
G/F	10	Luke Kennard	6 ft 5 in (1.96 m)	206 lb (93 kg)	1996-06-24	Duke
G/F	46	John Konchar	6 ft 5 in (1.96 m)	210 lb (95 kg)	1996-03-22	Purdue Fort Wayne
F	3	Jake LaRavia	6 ft 7 in (2.01 m)	235 lb (107 kg)	2001-11-03	Wake Forest
G	12	Ja Morant (injured)	6 ft 2 in (1.88 m)	174 lb (79 kg)	1999-08-10	Murray State
G	1	Scotty Pippen Jr. (TW)	6 ft 1 in (1.85 m)	185 lb (84 kg)	2000-11-10	Vanderbilt
G	23	Derrick Rose (injured)	6 ft 3 in (1.91 m)	200 lb (91 kg)	1988-10-04	Memphis
G	36	Marcus Smart (injured)	6 ft 3 in (1.91 m)	220 lb (100 kg)	1994-03-06	Oklahoma State
F	24	Lamar Stevens	6 ft 7 in (2.01 m)	230 lb (104 kg)	1997-07-09	Penn State
G/F	18	Yuta Watanabe (injured)	6 ft 9 in (2.06 m)	215 lb (98 kg)	1994-10-13	George Washington
G/F	5	Vince Williams Jr.	6 ft 4 in (1.93 m)	205 lb (93 kg)	2000-08-30	VCU
F	8	Ziaire Williams (injured)	6 ft 9 in (2.06 m)	185 lb (84 kg)	2001-09-12	Stanford

Coaches
Head coach
- Taylor Jenkins
Assistant(s)
- Blake Ahearn
- Anthony Carter
- Brad Jones
- Scoonie Penn
- Vitaly Potapenko
- Sonia Raman

Legend
- (DP) Unsigned draft pick
- (FA) Free agent
- (S) Suspended
- (GL) On assignment to G League affiliate
- (TW) Two-way affiliate player
- Injured

Roster
Updated: April 19, 2024

== Standings ==
=== Division ===
Southwest Division	W	L	PCT	GB	Home	Road	Div	GP
y – Dallas Mavericks	50	32	.610	–	25‍–‍16	25‍–‍16	11‍–‍5	82
x – New Orleans Pelicans	49	33	.598	1.0	21‍–‍19	28‍–‍14	9‍–‍7	82
Houston Rockets	41	41	.500	9.0	27‍–‍14	14‍–‍27	9‍–‍7	82
Memphis Grizzlies	27	55	.329	23.0	9‍–‍32	18‍–‍23	8‍–‍8	82
San Antonio Spurs	22	60	.268	28.0	12‍–‍29	10‍–‍31	3‍–‍13	82

=== Conference ===
Western Conference
#	Team	W	L	PCT	GB	GP
1	c – Oklahoma City Thunder *	57	25	.695	–	82
2	x – Denver Nuggets	57	25	.695	–	82
3	x – Minnesota Timberwolves	56	26	.683	1.0	82
4	y – Los Angeles Clippers *	51	31	.622	6.0	82
5	y – Dallas Mavericks *	50	32	.610	7.0	82
6	x – Phoenix Suns	49	33	.598	8.0	82
7	x – New Orleans Pelicans	49	33	.598	8.0	82
8	x – Los Angeles Lakers	47	35	.573	10.0	82
9	pi – Sacramento Kings	46	36	.561	11.0	82
10	pi – Golden State Warriors	46	36	.561	11.0	82
11	Houston Rockets	41	41	.500	16.0	82
12	Utah Jazz	31	51	.378	26.0	82
13	Memphis Grizzlies	27	55	.329	30.0	82
14	San Antonio Spurs	22	60	.268	35.0	82
15	Portland Trail Blazers	21	61	.256	36.0	82

== Game log ==
=== Preseason ===
2023 preseason game log
Total: 2–3 (Home: 2–0; Road: 0–3)
Preseason: 2–3 (home: 2–0; road: 0–3)

Game	Date	Team	Score	High points	High rebounds	High assists	Location Attendance	Record
1	October 8	Indiana	W 127–122 (OT)	Jaren Jackson Jr. (18)	Santi Aldama (8)	Jacob Gilyard (6)	FedExForum; 14,403	1–0
2	October 10	Milwaukee	W 108–102	Desmond Bane (21)	Xavier Tillman (8)	Derrick Rose (7)	FedExForum; 14,797	2–0
3	October 12	@ Atlanta	L 102–103	GG Jackson (24)	Vince Williams Jr. (9)	Jacob Gilyard (10)	State Farm Arena; 12,437	2–1
4	October 15	@ Miami	L 124–132	Desmond Bane (26)	J. Jackson, Tillman (6)	Gilyard, Rose (5)	Kaseya Center; 19,600	2–2
5	October 20	@ Milwaukee	L 116–124	Desmond Bane (24)	Tillman, Z. Williams (7)	Marcus Smart (6)	Fiserv Forum; 15,993	2–3

2023–24 preseason schedule

=== Regular season ===
This became the first regular season where all the NBA teams competed in a mid-season tournament setting due to the implementation of the 2023 NBA In-Season Tournament.

2023–24 game log
Total: 27–55 (Home: 9–32; Road: 18–23)
October: 0–4 (home: 0–3; road: 0–1)

Game	Date	Team	Score	High points	High rebounds	High assists	Location Attendance	Record
1	October 25	New Orleans	L 104–111	Desmond Bane (31)	Xavier Tillman (12)	Desmond Bane (5)	FedExForum; 17,798	0–1
2	October 27	Denver	L 104–108	Jaren Jackson Jr. (21)	J. Jackson, Z. Williams (9)	Marcus Smart (5)	FedExForum; 16,617	0–2
3	October 28	@ Washington	L 106–113	Desmond Bane (26)	Ziaire Williams (10)	Marcus Smart (6)	Capital One Arena; 16,191	0–3
4	October 30	Dallas	L 110–125	Bane, J. Jackson (30)	Jaren Jackson Jr. (9)	Marcus Smart (9)	FedExForum; 15,031	0–4

November: 4–9 (home: 1–5; road: 3–4)

Game	Date	Team	Score	High points	High rebounds	High assists	Location Attendance	Record
5	November 1	@ Utah	L 109–133	Desmond Bane (21)	Jaren Jackson Jr. (8)	Gilyard, Smart (6)	Delta Center; 18,206	0–5
6	November 3	@ Portland	L 113–115 (OT)	Desmond Bane (33)	Jaren Jackson Jr. (10)	Desmond Bane (7)	Moda Center; 18,592	0–6
7	November 5	@ Portland	W 112–100	Desmond Bane (30)	Bismack Biyombo (11)	Bane, Smart (5)	Moda Center; 18,187	1–6
8	November 8	Miami	L 102–108	Jaren Jackson Jr. (28)	Bismack Biyombo (10)	Marcus Smart (7)	FedExForum; 16,781	1–7
9	November 10	Utah	L 121–127	Desmond Bane (37)	Bismack Biyombo (14)	Bane, Gilyard (8)	FedExForum; 16,977	1–8
10	November 12	@ L.A. Clippers	W 105–101	Desmond Bane (27)	Bismack Biyombo (12)	Marcus Smart (7)	Crypto.com Arena; 17,220	2–8
11	November 14	@ L.A. Lakers	L 107–134	Santi Aldama (24)	Bismack Biyombo (8)	John Konchar (6)	Crypto.com Arena; 18,430	2–9
12	November 18	@ San Antonio	W 120–108	Jaren Jackson Jr. (27)	Santi Aldama (10)	Ziaire Williams (5)	Frost Bank Center; 18,354	3–9
13	November 19	Boston	L 100–102	Desmond Bane (30)	Santi Aldama (12)	Desmond Bane (8)	FedExForum; 17,798	3–10
14	November 22	@ Houston	L 91–111	Bane, J. Jackson (23)	John Konchar (11)	Bane, Gilyard (4)	Toyota Center; 18,055	3–11
15	November 24	Phoenix	L 89–110	Santi Aldama (21)	Jaren Jackson Jr. (7)	Desmond Bane (10)	FedExForum; 17,794	3–12
16	November 26	Minnesota	L 97–119	Jaren Jackson Jr. (18)	Santi Aldama (7)	Bane, Rose (4)	FedExForum; 15,764	3–13
17	November 29	Utah	W 105–91	Jaren Jackson Jr. (20)	V. Williams, Z. Williams (8)	Bane, Rose (9)	FedExForum; 15,327	4–13

December: 6–9 (home: 1–4; road: 5–5)

Game	Date	Team	Score	High points	High rebounds	High assists	Location Attendance	Record
18	December 1	@ Dallas	W 108–94	Desmond Bane (30)	Santi Aldama (12)	Desmond Bane (5)	American Airlines Center; 20,150	5–13
19	December 2	@ Phoenix	L 109–116	Jaren Jackson Jr. (37)	Jaren Jackson Jr. (9)	Desmond Bane (5)	Footprint Center; 17,071	5–14
20	December 6	@ Detroit	W 116–102	Desmond Bane (49)	Bismack Biyombo (11)	Desmond Bane (8)	Little Caesars Arena; 12,862	6–14
21	December 8	Minnesota	L 103–127	Jaren Jackson Jr. (21)	Santi Aldama (10)	Derrick Rose (7)	FedExForum; 15,577	6–15
22	December 11	Dallas	L 113–120	Jaren Jackson Jr. (41)	Vince Williams Jr. (9)	Desmond Bane (8)	FedExForum; 16,379	6–16
23	December 13	@ Houston	L 104–117	Jaren Jackson Jr. (44)	J. Jackson, V. Williams (7)	Derrick Rose (6)	Toyota Center; 16,813	6–17
24	December 15	Houston	L 96–103	Desmond Bane (28)	Desmond Bane (13)	three players (3)	FedExForum; 16,941	6–18
25	December 18	@ Oklahoma City	L 97–116	Ziaire Williams (19)	Santi Aldama (9)	Jacob Gilyard (7)	Paycom Center; 16,409	6–19
26	December 19	@ New Orleans	W 115–113	Ja Morant (34)	John Konchar (8)	Ja Morant (8)	Smoothie King Center; 18,355	7–19
27	December 21	Indiana	W 116–103	Desmond Bane (31)	Jaren Jackson Jr. (8)	Ja Morant (8)	FedExForum; 18,160	8–19
28	December 23	@ Atlanta	W 125–119	Desmond Bane (37)	Biyombo, V. Williams (11)	Ja Morant (11)	State Farm Arena; 17,632	9–19
29	December 26	@ New Orleans	W 116–115 (OT)	Ja Morant (31)	Jaren Jackson Jr. (10)	Bane, Morant (7)	Smoothie King Center; 18,538	10–19
30	December 28	@ Denver	L 105–142	Desmond Bane (23)	Vince Williams Jr. (11)	Marcus Smart (5)	Ball Arena; 19,733	10–20
31	December 29	@ L.A. Clippers	L 106–117	J. Jackson, Smart (22)	Desmond Bane (7)	Ja Morant (10)	Crypto.com Arena; 19,370	10–21
32	December 31	Sacramento	L 92–123	Jaren Jackson Jr. (18)	Desmond Bane (7)	Desmond Bane (6)	FedExForum; 17,794	10–22

January: 8–7 (home: 3–4; road: 5–3)

Game	Date	Team	Score	High points	High rebounds	High assists	Location Attendance	Record
33	January 2	San Antonio	W 106–98	Ja Morant (26)	Santi Aldama (11)	Ja Morant (10)	FedExForum; 17,794	11–22
34	January 3	Toronto	L 111–116	Ja Morant (28)	Aldama, Morant (8)	Ja Morant (9)	FedExForum; 16,385	11–23
35	January 5	@ L.A. Lakers	W 127–113	Jaren Jackson Jr. (31)	Bismack Biyombo (10)	Desmond Bane (13)	Crypto.com Arena; 18,997	12–23
36	January 7	@ Phoenix	W 121–115	Jaren Jackson Jr. (28)	Jaren Jackson Jr. (10)	Marcus Smart (8)	Footprint Center; 17,071	13–23
37	January 9	@ Dallas	W 120–103	Desmond Bane (32)	Xavier Tillman (11)	Vince Williams Jr. (6)	American Airlines Center; 20,116	14–23
38	January 12	L.A. Clippers	L 119–128	Jaren Jackson Jr. (21)	Xavier Tillman (9)	Jacob Gilyard (8)	FedExForum; 16,617	14–24
39	January 13	New York	L 94–106	GG Jackson (20)	Vince Williams Jr. (8)	Vince Williams Jr. (8)	FedExForum; 16,598	14–25
40	January 15	Golden State	W 116–107	Vince Williams Jr. (24)	Roddy, V. Williams (7)	J. Jackson, Kennard (5)	FedExForum; 16,612	15–25
41	January 18	@ Minnesota	L 103–118	Jaren Jackson Jr. (36)	Vince Williams Jr. (7)	Xavier Tillman (6)	Target Center; 18,024	15–26
42	January 20	@ Chicago	L 96–125	Jaren Jackson Jr. (26)	Santi Aldama (8)	Kennard, Konchar (6)	United Center; 21,441	15–27
43	January 22	@ Toronto	W 108–100	Jaren Jackson Jr. (27)	Vince Williams Jr. (10)	Luke Kennard (7)	Scotiabank Arena; 18,577	16–27
44	January 24	@ Miami	W 105–96	Vince Williams Jr. (25)	John Konchar (7)	Jacob Gilyard (7)	Kaseya Center; 19,600	17–27
45	January 26	Orlando	W 107–106	Jaren Jackson Jr. (30)	David Roddy (10)	Luke Kennard (6)	FedExForum; 16,823	18–27
46	January 28	@ Indiana	L 110–116	Jaren Jackson Jr. (25)	Vince Williams Jr. (8)	J. Jackson, Konchar, Pippen Jr. (4)	Gainbridge Fieldhouse; 16,519	18–28
47	January 29	Sacramento	L 94–103	Jaren Jackson Jr. (22)	David Roddy (10)	Gilyard, Pippen Jr. (5)	FedExForum; 15,333	18–29

February: 2–10 (home: 2–6; road: 0–4)

Game	Date	Team	Score	High points	High rebounds	High assists	Location Attendance	Record
48	February 1	Cleveland	L 101–108	Jaren Jackson Jr. (25)	Santi Aldama (9)	Jacob Gilyard (6)	FedExForum; 15,505	18–30
49	February 2	Golden State	L 101–121	Jaren Jackson Jr. (27)	John Konchar (12)	Gilyard, Konchar (5)	FedExForum; 17,794	18–31
50	February 4	@ Boston	L 91–131	Scotty Pippen Jr. (19)	Tosan Evbuomwan (12)	Jacob Gilyard (6)	TD Garden; 19,156	18–32
51	February 6	@ New York	L 113–123	Vince Williams Jr. (19)	Trey Jemison (7)	Aldama, Konchar, V. Williams (5)	Madison Square Garden; 19,013	18–33
52	February 8	Chicago	L 110–118	Jaren Jackson Jr. (28)	Vince Williams Jr. (11)	Vince Williams Jr. (8)	FedExForum; 16,285	18–34
53	February 10	@ Charlotte	L 106–115	Jaren Jackson Jr. (29)	John Konchar (10)	Vince Williams Jr. (8)	Spectrum Center; 17,259	18–35
54	February 12	New Orleans	L 87–96	Jaren Jackson Jr. (22)	Lamar Stevens (7)	Vince Williams Jr. (9)	FedExForum; 15,823	18–36
55	February 14	Houston	W 121–113	GG Jackson (20)	GG Jackson (9)	Vince Williams Jr. (7)	FedExForum; 15,012	19–36
56	February 15	Milwaukee	W 113–110	Z. Williams, G. Jackson (27)	Vince Williams Jr. (12)	V. Williams, Aldama (7)	FedExForum; 16,544	20–36
All-Star Game
57	February 23	L.A. Clippers	L 95–101	Jaren Jackson Jr. (29)	Lamar Stevens (8)	Vince Williams Jr. (8)	FedExForum; 17,255	20–37
58	February 26	Brooklyn	L 86–111	Lamar Stevens (17)	Lamar Stevens (6)	Vince Williams Jr. (5)	FedExForum; 15,417	20–38
59	February 28	@ Minnesota	L 101–110	Jaren Jackson Jr. (33)	Jaren Jackson Jr. (13)	Jordan Goodwin (8)	Target Center; 18,024	20–39

March: 4–11 (home: 1–6; road: 3–5)

Game	Date	Team	Score	High points	High rebounds	High assists	Location Attendance	Record
60	March 1	Portland	L 92–122	Jake LaRavia (21)	Santi Aldama (8)	Vince Williams Jr. (5)	FedExForum; 15,493	20–40
61	March 2	Portland	L 100–107 (OT)	Aldama, V. Williams (21)	Aldama, V. Williams (8)	Jordan Goodwin (8)	FedExForum; 16,381	20–41
62	March 4	@ Brooklyn	W 106–102	Luke Kennard (25)	Jake LaRavia (10)	Luke Kennard (7)	Barclays Center; 15,847	21–41
63	March 6	@ Philadelphia	W 115–109	Jaren Jackson Jr. (30)	Jake LaRavia (13)	Vince Williams Jr. (9)	Wells Fargo Center; 19,757	22–41
64	March 8	Atlanta	L 92–99	Jaren Jackson Jr. (21)	Jaren Jackson Jr. (9)	Vince Williams Jr. (6)	FedExForum; 16,667	22–42
65	March 10	@ Oklahoma City	L 93–124	GG Jackson (30)	DeJon Jarreau (10)	DeJon Jarreau (5)	Paycom Center; 18,203	22–43
66	March 12	Washington	W 109–97	Trey Jemison (24)	Jordan Goodwin (12)	Luke Kennard (8)	FedExForum; 15,291	23–43
67	March 13	Charlotte	L 98–110	GG Jackson (26)	John Konchar (9)	Scotty Pippen Jr. (10)	FedExForum; 16,717	23–44
68	March 16	Oklahoma City	L 112–118	Desmond Bane (22)	Aldama, J. Jackson (6)	Luke Kennard (9)	FedExForum; 17,012	23–45
69	March 18	@ Sacramento	L 111–121 (OT)	Jaren Jackson Jr. (25)	John Konchar (10)	Jake LaRavia (5)	Golden 1 Center; 17,832	23–46
70	March 20	@ Golden State	L 116–137	GG Jackson (35)	DeJon Jarreau (10)	Konchar, Jarreau (5)	Chase Center; 18,064	23–47
71	March 22	@ San Antonio	W 99–97	Jaren Jackson Jr. (28)	Santi Aldama (13)	Jordan Goodwin (5)	Frost Bank Center; 17,408	24–47
72	March 25	@ Denver	L 103–128	Lamar Stevens (19)	Santi Aldama (9)	Jaren Jackson Jr. (5)	Ball Arena; 19,536	24–48
73	March 27	L.A. Lakers	L 124–136	Desmond Bane (26)	Jaren Jackson Jr. (9)	Desmond Bane (16)	FedExForum; 17,794	24–49
74	March 30	@ Orlando	L 88–118	Jordan Goodwin (16)	Jordan Goodwin (11)	Luke Kennard (5)	Kia Center; 18,009	24–50

April: 3–4 (home: 1–3; road: 2–1)

Game	Date	Team	Score	High points	High rebounds	High assists	Location Attendance	Record
75	April 1	@ Detroit	W 110–108	Jaren Jackson Jr. (40)	Jordan Goodwin (13)	Luke Kennard (8)	Little Caesars Arena; 19,999	25–50
76	April 3	@ Milwaukee	W 111–101	Jaren Jackson Jr. (35)	Goodwin, G. Jackson (12)	Jordan Goodwin (7)	Fiserv Forum; 17,420	26–50
77	April 5	Detroit	W 108–90	Jemison, Pereira (17)	Trey Jemison (13)	Scotty Pippen Jr. (7)	FedExForum; 16,745	27–50
78	April 6	Philadelphia	L 96–116	Scotty Pippen Jr. (24)	Mãozinha Pereira (11)	Scotty Pippen Jr. (5)	FedExForum; 17,794	27–51
79	April 9	San Antonio	L 87–102	Clarke, Jemison, Pippen Jr. (14)	Jordan Goodwin (19)	Goodwin, Pippen Jr., Simpson (5)	FedExForum; 16,108	27–52
80	April 10	@ Cleveland	L 98–110	Jake LaRavia (32)	Trey Jemison (9)	Scotty Pippen Jr. (6)	Rocket Mortgage FieldHouse; 19,432	27–53
81	April 12	L.A. Lakers	L 120–123	GG Jackson (31)	Jordan Goodwin (17)	LaRavia, Pippen Jr. (6)	FedExForum; 17,794	27–54
82	April 14	Denver	L 111–126	GG Jackson (44)	GG Jackson (12)	Scotty Pippen Jr. (7)	FedExForum; 17,544	27–55

2023–24 season schedule

=== In-Season Tournament ===
This was the first regular season where all the NBA teams competed in a mid-season tournament setting due to the implementation of the 2023 NBA In-Season Tournament. During the in-season tournament period, the Grizzlies competed in Group A of the Western Conference, which included the Phoenix Suns, the Los Angeles Lakers, the Utah Jazz, and the Portland Trail Blazers. Throughout this period of time, they were without Ja Morant playing for them due to a suspension he had relating to another gun incident earlier in 2023, as well as without Steven Adams due to a season-ending injury. After three straight losses to the Trail Blazers, Jazz, and Lakers, the Grizzlies were automatically eliminated from in-season tournament contention, being the first team out at that time.

==== West group A ====
Pos	Team	Pld	W	L	PF	PA	PD	Qualification	LAL	PHX	UTA	POR	MEM
1	Los Angeles Lakers	4	4	0	494	420	+74	Advance to knockout stage	—	122–119	131–99	107–95	134–107
2	Phoenix Suns	4	3	1	480	446	+34	Advance to knockout stage	119–122	—	131–128	120–107	110–89
3	Utah Jazz	4	2	2	469	482	−13		99–131	128–131	—	115–99	127–121
4	Portland Trail Blazers	4	1	3	416	455	−39		95–107	107–120	99–115	—	115–113 (OT)
5	Memphis Grizzlies	4	0	4	430	486	−56		107–134	89–110	121–127	113–115 (OT)	—

Source: NBA
Rules for classification: Tiebreakers

== Player statistics ==
=== Regular season ===
Player	POS	GP	GS	MP	REB	AST	STL	BLK	PTS	MPG	RPG	APG	SPG	BPG	PPG
Jaren Jackson Jr.	C	66	66	2,124	365	154	80	106	1,486	32.2	5.5	2.3	1.2	1.6	22.5
Santi Aldama	PF	61	35	1,618	352	138	43	54	654	26.5	5.8	2.3	.7	.9	10.7
John Konchar	SF	55	23	1,173	257	110	51	51	235	21.3	4.7	2.0	.9	.9	4.3
Vince Williams Jr.	SG	52	33	1,436	290	175	47	34	521	27.6	5.6	3.4	.9	.7	10.0
Ziaire Williams	SF	51	15	1,038	180	75	36	9	420	20.4	3.5	1.5	.7	.2	8.2
GG Jackson	PF	48	18	1,233	196	59	28	24	699	25.7	4.1	1.2	.6	.5	14.6
David Roddy^{†}	PF	48	13	1,114	200	76	25	11	403	23.2	4.2	1.6	.5	.2	8.4
Desmond Bane	SG	42	42	1,443	185	230	43	22	997	34.4	4.4	5.5	1.0	.5	23.7
Luke Kennard	SG	39	22	999	113	136	20	2	429	25.6	2.9	3.5	.5	.1	11.0
Jacob Gilyard^{†}	PG	37	14	654	43	131	27	5	173	17.7	1.2	3.5	.7	.1	4.7
Jake LaRavia	PF	35	6	806	128	58	29	12	379	23.0	3.7	1.7	.8	.3	10.8
Xavier Tillman^{†}	C	34	13	700	157	57	42	35	204	20.6	4.6	1.7	1.2	1.0	6.0
Bismack Biyombo^{†}	C	30	27	718	191	51	10	34	156	23.9	6.4	1.7	.3	1.1	5.2
Derrick Rose	PG	24	7	399	45	78	8	2	191	16.6	1.9	3.3	.3	.1	8.0
Trey Jemison^{†}	C	23	14	572	133	27	12	28	171	24.9	5.8	1.2	.5	1.2	7.4
Scotty Pippen Jr.	PG	21	16	527	67	98	36	10	271	25.1	3.2	4.7	1.7	.5	12.9
Marcus Smart	PG	20	20	605	53	86	41	5	289	30.3	2.7	4.3	2.1	.3	14.5
Lamar Stevens^{†}	PF	19	2	437	96	20	17	17	219	23.0	5.1	1.1	.9	.9	11.5
Jordan Goodwin^{†}	PG	17	12	497	136	77	25	9	170	29.2	8.0	4.5	1.5	.5	10.0
Kenneth Lofton Jr.^{†}	PF	15	0	99	15	14	3	3	39	6.6	1.0	.9	.2	.2	2.6
Ja Morant	PG	9	9	318	50	73	7	5	226	35.3	5.6	8.1	.8	.6	25.1
Jaylen Nowell^{†}	SG	9	1	156	14	16	3	0	51	17.3	1.6	1.8	.3	.0	5.7
DeJon Jarreau	SG	9	0	150	44	26	6	2	43	16.7	4.9	2.9	.7	.2	4.8
Matthew Hurt	PF	8	0	113	16	4	3	3	32	14.1	2.0	.5	.4	.4	4.0
Mãozinha Pereira	SF	7	1	122	37	2	6	4	48	17.4	5.3	.3	.9	.6	6.9
Zavier Simpson	PG	7	0	161	20	25	7	3	42	23.0	2.9	3.6	1.0	.4	6.0
Brandon Clarke	PF	6	1	134	32	9	5	6	68	22.3	5.3	1.5	.8	1.0	11.3
Timmy Allen	SF	5	0	125	17	5	4	0	13	25.0	3.4	1.0	.8	.0	2.6
Yuta Watanabe^{†}	SF	5	0	82	9	5	3	0	13	16.4	1.8	1.0	.6	.0	2.6
Wenyen Gabriel	PF	5	0	81	25	3	2	2	17	16.2	5.0	.6	.4	.4	3.4
Tosan Evbuomwan^{†}	SF	4	0	74	14	6	0	1	10	18.5	3.5	1.5	.0	.3	2.5
Jack White	SF	4	0	64	12	1	4	1	6	16.0	3.0	.3	1.0	.3	1.5
Shaquille Harrison	SG	3	0	6	2	0	0	1	2	2.0	.7	.0	.0	.3	.7

- ^{†} Denotes player spent time with another team in the season. Stats reflect time with the Grizzlies only.

== Transactions ==
=== Trades ===
June 23, 2023	To Memphis Grizzlies Marcus Smart (from Boston)	To Boston Celtics Kristaps Porziņģis (from Washington); Draft rights to Marcus Sasser (No. 25) (from Memphis); 2024 GSW first-round pick (from Memphis)
June 23, 2023	To Washington Wizards Tyus Jones (from Memphis); Danilo Gallinari (from Boston); Mike Muscala (from Boston); Draft rights to Julian Phillips (No. 35) (from Boston)
July 8, 2023	To Memphis Grizzlies Josh Christopher (from Houston)	To Oklahoma City Thunder Patty Mills (from Houston); 2024 HOU second-round pick 2029 HOU second-round pick 2030 HOU second-round pick
July 8, 2023	To Atlanta Hawks Usman Garuba (from Houston); TyTy Washington Jr. (from Houston); Two future second-round picks (from Houston); Cash considerations (from Oklahoma City)	To Los Angeles Clippers Kenyon Martin Jr. (from Houston)
July 8, 2023	To Houston Rockets Dillon Brooks (from Memphis); Two future second-round picks (from LA Clippers); Draft rights to Alpha Kaba (from Atlanta)
July 11, 2023	To Memphis Grizzlies Isaiah Todd; Two future first-round pick swaps	To Phoenix Suns Three future second-round picks

=== Free agency ===
==== Additions ====
Player	Signed	Former team	Ref.
Derrick Rose	July 3	New York Knicks	
