= 2022–23 Memphis Grizzlies season =

- Division champions
- Head coach: Taylor Jenkins
- General manager: Jason Wexler
- Owner: Robert Pera
- Arena: FedExForum

Results
- Record: 51–31 (.622)
- Place: Division: 1st (Southwest); Conference: 2nd (Western)
- Playoff finish: First round (lost to Lakers 2–4)
- Stats at Basketball Reference

Local media
- Television: Bally Sports South; Bally Sports Southeast
- Radio: WMFS-FM

The 2022–23 Memphis Grizzlies season was the 28th season of the franchise in the National Basketball Association (NBA) and 22nd in Memphis. The Grizzlies played on Christmas Day for the first time in franchise history, but lost the game to the Golden State Warriors 123–109.

The Grizzlies qualified for the playoffs for the third consecutive season and won the Southwest division title for the second consecutive season. In the playoffs the Grizzlies were upset by the seventh-seeded Los Angeles Lakers in the first round, losing in six games, becoming the sixth 2-seed team to lose a playoff series against a 7-seed, following the Dallas Mavericks in 1987, the Utah Jazz in 1989, the San Antonio Spurs in 1991, the Miami Heat in 1998, and the Dallas Mavericks again in 2010.

Throughout the season, the Grizzlies were marred by controversy, being heavily scrutinized for their antics and lack of maturity. Particularly scrutinized was Dillon Brooks, who was amongst the league leaders for most technical and flagrant fouls and, throughout the season, became known for cheap shots on opposing players and even a cameraman, leading to multiple fines and one-game suspensions. Ja Morant was also under much scrutiny for his and his entourage's outside conduct, with his entourage getting into a notably aggressive confrontation with the Indiana Pacers after a game, his father getting into repeated sideline confrontations, and Morant flashing a gun on Instagram Live which led him to get suspended for eight games near the end of the regular season. After the season ended, Morant flashed another gun on Instagram Live, leading to him being suspended for the first twenty-five games of the following season.

Following their loss to the Lakers, the team, particularly Morant and Brooks, was roundly mocked on social media due to their conduct throughout the season and postseason. After the season, Brooks was acquired by the Houston Rockets in a sign-and-trade agreement after being told he would "not be brought back under any circumstances" to the Grizzlies.

== Draft ==
Round	Pick	Player	Position	Nationality	College/Club
1	22	Walker Kessler	Center	United States	Auburn
1	29	TyTy Washington	Point guard	United States	Kentucky
2	47	Vince Williams Jr.	Shooting guard	United States	VCU

The Grizzlies had two first-round picks and one second-round pick entering the draft. On draft night, they traded the draft rights of center Walker Kessler and guard TyTy Washington to the Timberwolves, in exchange for #19 pick Jake LaRavia.

On June 24, they acquired the rights to Tennessee guard Kennedy Chandler from the Spurs for a future 2nd-round pick. On July 2, they would sign forward Kenneth Lofton Jr. of Louisiana Tech to a two-way contract, after he went undrafted. Lofton Jr. would go on to win the G-League's Rookie of the Year Award as a featured member of their Memphis Hustle affiliate.

== Roster ==
2022–23 Memphis Grizzlies roster
Players

Pos.	No.	Player	Height	Weight	DOB	From
C	4	Steven Adams (injured)	6 ft 11 in (2.11 m)	265 lb (120 kg)	1993-07-20	Pittsburgh
F/C	7	Santi Aldama	7 ft 0 in (2.13 m)	215 lb (98 kg)	2001-01-10	Loyola (MD)
G	22	Desmond Bane	6 ft 5 in (1.96 m)	215 lb (98 kg)	1998-06-25	TCU
G/F	24	Dillon Brooks	6 ft 6 in (1.98 m)	225 lb (102 kg)	1996-01-22	Oregon
F	15	Brandon Clarke (injured)	6 ft 8 in (2.03 m)	215 lb (98 kg)	1996-09-19	Gonzaga
G	0	Jacob Gilyard (TW)	5 ft 9 in (1.75 m)	160 lb (73 kg)	1998-07-14	Richmond
F/C	13	Jaren Jackson Jr.	6 ft 10 in (2.08 m)	242 lb (110 kg)	1999-09-15	Michigan State
G	21	Tyus Jones	6 ft 2 in (1.88 m)	196 lb (89 kg)	1996-05-10	Duke
G	10	Luke Kennard	6 ft 5 in (1.96 m)	206 lb (93 kg)	1996-06-24	Duke
G	46	John Konchar	6 ft 5 in (1.96 m)	210 lb (95 kg)	1996-03-22	Purdue Fort Wayne
F	3	Jake LaRavia	6 ft 7 in (2.01 m)	235 lb (107 kg)	2001-11-03	Wake Forest
F	6	Kenneth Lofton Jr.	6 ft 6 in (1.98 m)	275 lb (125 kg)	2002-08-14	Louisiana Tech
G	12	Ja Morant	6 ft 2 in (1.88 m)	174 lb (79 kg)	1999-08-10	Murray State
F	27	David Roddy	6 ft 4 in (1.93 m)	255 lb (116 kg)	2001-03-27	Colorado State
F	2	Xavier Tillman	6 ft 7 in (2.01 m)	245 lb (111 kg)	1999-01-12	Michigan State
G	5	Vince Williams Jr. (TW)	6 ft 4 in (1.93 m)	205 lb (93 kg)	2000-08-30	VCU
F	8	Ziaire Williams	6 ft 9 in (2.06 m)	185 lb (84 kg)	2001-09-12	Stanford

Coaches
Head coach
- Taylor Jenkins
Assistant(s)
- Blake Ahearn
- Brad Jones
- David McClure
- Scoonie Penn
- Vitaly Potapenko
- Darko Rajaković
- Sonia Raman

Legend
- (DP) Unsigned draft pick
- (FA) Free agent
- (S) Suspended
- (GL) On assignment to G League affiliate
- (TW) Two-way affiliate player
- Injured

Roster
Updated: April 8, 2023

== Standings ==
=== Division ===
Southwest Division	W	L	PCT	GB	Home	Road	Div	GP
y – Memphis Grizzlies	51	31	.622	–	35‍–‍6	16‍–‍25	13–3	82
pi – New Orleans Pelicans	42	40	.512	9.0	27‍–‍14	15‍–‍26	11–5	82
Dallas Mavericks	38	44	.463	13.0	23‍–‍18	15‍–‍26	9–7	82
Houston Rockets	22	60	.268	29.0	14‍–‍27	8‍–‍33	4–12	82
San Antonio Spurs	22	60	.268	29.0	14‍–‍27	8‍–‍33	3–13	82

=== Conference ===
Western Conference
#	Team	W	L	PCT	GB	GP
1	c – Denver Nuggets *	53	29	.646	–	82
2	y – Memphis Grizzlies *	51	31	.622	2.0	82
3	y – Sacramento Kings *	48	34	.585	5.0	82
4	x – Phoenix Suns	45	37	.549	8.0	82
5	x – Los Angeles Clippers	44	38	.537	9.0	82
6	x – Golden State Warriors	44	38	.537	9.0	82
7	x – Los Angeles Lakers	43	39	.524	10.0	82
8	x – Minnesota Timberwolves	42	40	.512	11.0	82
9	pi – New Orleans Pelicans	42	40	.512	11.0	82
10	pi – Oklahoma City Thunder	40	42	.488	13.0	82
11	Dallas Mavericks	38	44	.463	15.0	82
12	Utah Jazz	37	45	.451	16.0	82
13	Portland Trail Blazers	33	49	.402	20.0	82
14	Houston Rockets	22	60	.268	31.0	82
15	San Antonio Spurs	22	60	.268	31.0	82

== Game log ==
=== Preseason ===
2022 preseason game log
Total: 3–2 (home: 1–1; road: 2–1)
Preseason: 3–2 (home: 1–1; road: 2–1)

Game	Date	Team	Score	High points	High rebounds	High assists	Location Attendance	Record
1	October 1	@ Milwaukee	W 107–102	David Roddy (18)	Santi Aldama (7)	Kennedy Chandler (8)	Fiserv Forum; 13,023	1–0
2	October 3	Orlando	W 109–97	Ja Morant (22)	John Konchar (9)	Ja Morant (7)	FedExForum; 13,431	2–0
3	October 7	Miami	L 108–111	Dillon Brooks (18)	Steven Adams (8)	Tyus Jones (5)	FedExForum; 14,395	2–1
4	October 11	@ Orlando	L 105–109	Desmond Bane (33)	Steven Adams (10)	Brooks, Morant (4)	Amway Center; 16,006	2–2
5	October 13	@ Detroit	W 126–111	Ja Morant (31)	Adams, Aldama, Morant (8)	Ja Morant (4)	Little Caesars Arena; 12,104	3–2

2022–23 season schedule

=== Regular season ===
2022–23 game log
Total: 51–31 (home: 35–6; road: 16–25)
October: 4–3 (home: 2–0; road: 2–3)

Game	Date	Team	Score	High points	High rebounds	High assists	Location Attendance	Record
1	October 19	New York	W 115–112 (OT)	Ja Morant (34)	Steven Adams (14)	Ja Morant (9)	FedExForum; 18,202	1–0
2	October 21	@ Houston	W 129–122	Ja Morant (49)	Adams, Aldama (9)	Ja Morant (8)	Toyota Center; 17,878	2–0
3	October 22	@ Dallas	L 96–138	Ja Morant (20)	Santi Aldama (6)	Tyus Jones (5)	American Airlines Center; 20,377	2–1
4	October 24	Brooklyn	W 134–124	Bane, Morant (38)	Steven Adams (13)	Bane, Morant (7)	FedExForum; 17,392	3–1
5	October 27	@ Sacramento	W 125–110	Desmond Bane (31)	Steven Adams (11)	Ja Morant (6)	Golden 1 Center; 15,511	4–1
6	October 29	@ Utah	L 123–124	Desmond Bane (32)	Steven Adams (10)	Tyus Jones (10)	Vivint Arena; 18,206	4–2
7	October 31	@ Utah	L 105–121	Ja Morant (37)	Steven Adams (9)	Ja Morant (4)	Vivint Arena; 18,206	4–3

November : 8–6 (home: 5–2; road: 3–4)

Game	Date	Team	Score	High points	High rebounds	High assists	Location Attendance	Record
8	November 2	@ Portland	W 121–105	Desmond Bane (29)	Steven Adams (11)	Ja Morant (7)	Moda Center; 19,462	5–3
9	November 4	Charlotte	W 130–99	Dillon Brooks (23)	Steven Adams (19)	Ja Morant (11)	FedExForum; 17,187	6–3
10	November 6	Washington	W 103–97	Desmond Bane (28)	Adams, Aldama (10)	Ja Morant (6)	FedExForum; 16,877	7–3
11	November 7	Boston	L 106–109	Ja Morant (30)	Clarke, Morant (8)	Ja Morant (9)	FedExForum; 17,371	7–4
12	November 9	@ San Antonio	W 124–122 (OT)	Bane, Morant (32)	Steven Adams (19)	Desmond Bane (6)	AT&T Center; 13,507	8–4
13	November 11	Minnesota	W 114–103	Ja Morant (28)	Ja Morant (10)	Ja Morant (8)	FedExForum; 16,939	9–4
14	November 13	@ Washington	L 92–102	Dillon Brooks (19)	Steven Adams (10)	Steven Adams (6)	Capital One Arena; 17,667	9–5
15	November 15	@ New Orleans	L 102–113	Ja Morant (36)	Brandon Clarke (13)	Ja Morant (4)	Smoothie King Center; 14,032	9–6
16	November 18	Oklahoma City	W 121–110	Jaren Jackson Jr. (25)	Jaren Jackson Jr. (12)	Ja Morant (11)	FedExForum; 17,324	10–6
17	November 20	@ Brooklyn	L 115–127	Dillon Brooks (31)	Steven Adams (10)	John Konchar (7)	Barclays Center; 18,241	10–7
18	November 22	Sacramento	L 109–113	Ja Morant (34)	Steven Adams (16)	Jones, Morant (6)	FedExForum; 16,826	10–8
19	November 25	New Orleans	W 132–111	Dillon Brooks (25)	Steven Adams (11)	Ja Morant (11)	FedExForum; 17,794	11–8
20	November 27	@ New York	W 127–123	Ja Morant (27)	Adams, Morant (10)	Ja Morant (14)	Madison Square Garden; 19,524	12–8
21	November 30	@ Minnesota	L 101–109	Ja Morant (24)	Steven Adams (12)	Ja Morant (6)	Target Center; 15,980	12–9

December: 10–4 (home: 7–1; road: 3–3)

Game	Date	Team	Score	High points	High rebounds	High assists	Location Attendance	Record
22	December 2	Philadelphia	W 117–109	Ja Morant (28)	Steven Adams (16)	Steven Adams (6)	FedExForum; 17,022	13–9
23	December 4	@ Detroit	W 122–112	Ja Morant (33)	Brandon Clarke (14)	Ja Morant (10)	Little Caesars Arena; 20,088	14–9
24	December 5	Miami	W 101–93	Tyus Jones (28)	Santi Aldama (10)	Tyus Jones (10)	FedExForum; 16,122	15–9
25	December 7	Oklahoma City	W 123–102	Ja Morant (26)	Ja Morant (13)	Ja Morant (11)	FedExForum; 15,942	16–9
26	December 9	Detroit	W 114–103	Jaren Jackson Jr. (20)	Steven Adams (8)	Ja Morant (12)	FedExForum; 17,103	17–9
27	December 12	Atlanta	W 128–103	Tyus Jones (22)	Jackson Jr., Konchar (7)	Tyus Jones (11)	FedExForum; 16,544	18–9
28	December 15	Milwaukee	W 142–101	Ja Morant (25)	Ja Morant (10)	Ja Morant (10)	FedExForum; 17,794	19–9
29	December 17	@ Oklahoma City	L 109–115	Dillon Brooks (32)	Clarke, Jackson Jr. (8)	John Konchar (3)	Paycom Center; 16,895	19–10
30	December 20	@ Denver	L 91–105	Ja Morant (35)	Steven Adams (10)	Ja Morant (10)	Ball Arena; 19,605	19–11
31	December 23	@ Phoenix	W 125–100	Clarke, Jackson Jr. (24)	Steven Adams (11)	Ja Morant (11)	Footprint Center; 17,071	20–11
32	December 25	@ Golden State	L 109–123	Ja Morant (36)	Steven Adams (14)	Ja Morant (8)	Chase Center; 18,064	20–12
33	December 27	Phoenix	L 108–125	Ja Morant (34)	Steven Adams (9)	Ja Morant (6)	FedExForum; 18,239	20–13
34	December 29	@ Toronto	W 119–106	Dillon Brooks (25)	Steven Adams (17)	Ja Morant (17)	Scotiabank Arena; 19,800	21–13
35	December 31	New Orleans	W 116–101	Ja Morant (32)	Steven Adams (21)	Jones, Morant (8)	FedExForum; 17,951	22–13

January : 10–5 (home: 7–0; road: 3–5)

Game	Date	Team	Score	High points	High rebounds	High assists	Location Attendance	Record
36	January 1	Sacramento	W 118–108	Ja Morant (35)	Steven Adams (23)	Tyus Jones (8)	FedExForum; 17,794	23–13
37	January 4	@ Charlotte	W 131–107	Ja Morant (23)	Steven Adams (15)	Ja Morant (8)	Spectrum Center; 19,077	24–13
38	January 5	@ Orlando	W 123–115	Ja Morant (32)	Jaren Jackson Jr. (10)	Tyus Jones (8)	Amway Center; 18,500	25–13
39	January 8	Utah	W 123–118	Desmond Bane (24)	Xavier Tillman (9)	Desmond Bane (9)	FedExForum; 17,794	26–13
40	January 9	San Antonio	W 121–113	Tyus Jones (24)	Steven Adams (15)	Tyus Jones (6)	FedExForum; 16,013	27–13
41	January 11	San Antonio	W 135–129	Ja Morant (38)	Steven Adams (18)	Steven Adams (5)	FedExForum; 16,454	28–13
42	January 14	@ Indiana	W 130–112	Desmond Bane (25)	Jaren Jackson Jr. (10)	Ja Morant (10)	Gainbridge Fieldhouse; 17,274	29–13
43	January 16	Phoenix	W 136–106	Ja Morant (29)	Steven Adams (9)	Tyus Jones (8)	FedExForum; 17,794	30–13
44	January 18	Cleveland	W 115–114	Desmond Bane (25)	Steven Adams (10)	Ja Morant (8)	FedExForum; 16,892	31–13
45	January 20	@ L.A. Lakers	L 121–122	Ja Morant (22)	Steven Adams (17)	Ja Morant (8)	Crypto.com Arena; 18,997	31–14
46	January 22	@ Phoenix	L 110–112	Ja Morant (27)	Steven Adams (16)	Ja Morant (8)	Footprint Center; 17,071	31–15
47	January 23	@ Sacramento	L 100–133	Desmond Bane (21)	Jones, Tillman (6)	Tyus Jones (8)	Golden 1 Center; 17,821	31–16
48	January 25	@ Golden State	L 120–122	Ja Morant (29)	Brandon Clarke (8)	Ja Morant (12)	Chase Center; 18,064	31–17
49	January 27	@ Minnesota	L 100–111	Ja Morant (27)	Ja Morant (10)	Ja Morant (11)	Target Center; 17,136	31–18
50	January 29	Indiana	W 112–100	Jaren Jackson Jr. (28)	Xavier Tillman (11)	Ja Morant (15)	FedExForum; 17,794	32–18

February : 5–5 (home: 5–2; road: 0–3)

Game	Date	Team	Score	High points	High rebounds	High assists	Location Attendance	Record
51	February 1	Portland	L 112–122	Ja Morant (32)	Xavier Tillman (10)	Ja Morant (12)	FedExForum; 14,589	32–19
52	February 2	@ Cleveland	L 113–128	Desmond Bane (25)	Santi Aldama (10)	Ja Morant (8)	Rocket Mortgage FieldHouse; 19,432	32–20
53	February 5	Toronto	L 103–106	Desmond Bane (26)	Xavier Tillman (9)	Tyus Jones (7)	FedExForum; 17,794	32–21
54	February 7	Chicago	W 104–89	Ja Morant (34)	Brandon Clarke (13)	Ja Morant (7)	FedExForum; 17,012	33–21
55	February 10	Minnesota	W 128–107	Ja Morant (32)	Ja Morant (9)	Ja Morant (9)	FedExForum; 17,794	34–21
56	February 12	@ Boston	L 109–119	Ja Morant (25)	Aldama, Jackson Jr. (7)	Bane, Morant (7)	TD Garden; 19,156	34–22
57	February 15	Utah	W 117–111	Jaren Jackson Jr. (26)	Brandon Clarke (10)	Ja Morant (9)	FedExForum; 16,748	35–22
58	February 23	@ Philadelphia	L 105–110	Desmond Bane (25)	Xavier Tillman (12)	Tyus Jones (6)	Wells Fargo Center; 21,205	35–23
59	February 25	Denver	W 112–94	Ja Morant (23)	Brandon Clarke (9)	Tyus Jones (5)	FedExForum; 18,302	36–23
60	February 28	L.A. Lakers	W 121–109	Ja Morant (39)	Xavier Tillman (11)	Ja Morant (10)	FedExForum; 17,794	37–23

March : 12–5 (home: 8–1; road: 4–4)

Game	Date	Team	Score	High points	High rebounds	High assists	Location Attendance	Record
61	March 1	@ Houston	W 113–99	Desmond Bane (30)	Desmond Bane (9)	Ja Morant (7)	Toyota Center; 15,919	38–23
62	March 3	@ Denver	L 97–113	Ja Morant (27)	Xavier Tillman (10)	Ja Morant (10)	Ball Arena; 19,641	38–24
63	March 5	@ L.A. Clippers	L 129–135	Desmond Bane (30)	Jackson Jr., Tillman (5)	Tyus Jones (12)	Crypto.com Arena; 19,068	38–25
64	March 7	@ L.A. Lakers	L 103–112	Jaren Jackson Jr. (26)	Xavier Tillman (10)	Bane, Kennard (5)	Crypto.com Arena; 18,997	38–26
65	March 9	Golden State	W 131–110	Tyus Jones (22)	Jaren Jackson Jr. (9)	Tyus Jones (11)	FedExForum; 17,794	39–26
66	March 11	Dallas	W 112–108	Desmond Bane (25)	Xavier Tillman (8)	Tyus Jones (10)	FedExForum; 17,794	40–26
67	March 13	@ Dallas	W 104–88	Desmond Bane (23)	Santi Aldama (9)	Desmond Bane (7)	American Airlines Center; 20,303	41–26
68	March 15	@ Miami	L 119–138	Jaren Jackson Jr. (25)	Jaren Jackson Jr. (9)	Tyus Jones (5)	Miami-Dade Arena; 19,794	41–27
69	March 17	@ San Antonio	W 126–120 (OT)	Jaren Jackson Jr. (28)	Tyus Jones (10)	Tyus Jones (10)	AT&T Center; 15,221	42–27
70	March 18	Golden State	W 133–119	Jaren Jackson Jr. (31)	Xavier Tillman (10)	Tyus Jones (14)	FedExForum; 18,396	43–27
71	March 20	Dallas	W 112–108	Jaren Jackson Jr. (28)	Santi Aldama (14)	Tyus Jones (6)	FedExForum; 17,794	44–27
72	March 22	Houston	W 130–125	Jaren Jackson Jr. (37)	Jaren Jackson Jr. (10)	Bane, Jones (7)	FedExForum; 17,794	45–27
73	March 24	Houston	W 151–114	Luke Kennard (30)	Jaren Jackson Jr. (7)	Tyus Jones (9)	FedExForum; 17,851	46–27
74	March 26	@ Atlanta	W 123–119	Ja Morant (27)	Jackson Jr., Tillman (8)	Ja Morant (6)	State Farm Arena; 18,056	47–27
75	March 28	Orlando	W 113–108	Desmond Bane (31)	Jaren Jackson Jr. (10)	Tyus Jones (8)	FedExForum; 16,507	48–27
76	March 29	L.A. Clippers	L 132–141	Ja Morant (36)	Xavier Tillman (9)	Ja Morant (9)	FedExForum; 16,775	48–28
77	March 31	L.A. Clippers	W 108–94	Desmond Bane (22)	Aldama, Jackson Jr., Tillman (8)	Desmond Bane (9)	FedExForum; 16,376	49–28

April : 2–3 (home: 1–0; road: 1–3)

Game	Date	Team	Score	High points	High rebounds	High assists	Location Attendance	Record
78	April 2	@ Chicago	L 107–128	Jaren Jackson Jr. (31)	Ja Morant (10)	Ja Morant (10)	United Center; 20,944	49–29
79	April 4	Portland	W 119–109	Desmond Bane (30)	Santi Aldama (11)	Ja Morant (9)	FedExForum; 17,558	50–29
80	April 6	@ New Orleans	L 131–138 (OT)	Jaren Jackson Jr. (40)	Jackson Jr., Konchar (9)	Tyus Jones (12)	Smoothie King Center; 17,232	50–30
81	April 7	@ Milwaukee	W 137–114	Jaren Jackson Jr. (36)	Desmond Bane (8)	Tyus Jones (9)	Fiserv Forum; 18,010	51–30
82	April 9	@ Oklahoma City	L 100–115	Kenneth Lofton Jr. (42)	Kenneth Lofton Jr. (14)	Ziaire Williams (9)	Paycom Center; 16,601	51–31

2022–23 season schedule

=== Playoffs ===
2023 playoff game log
Total: 2–4 (home: 2–1; road: 0–3)
First Round: 2–4 (home: 2–1; road: 0–3)

Game	Date	Team	Score	High points	High rebounds	High assists	Location Attendance	Series
1	April 16	L.A. Lakers	L 112–128	Jaren Jackson Jr. (31)	Aldama, Morant (6)	Desmond Bane (6)	FedExForum; 18,487	0–1
2	April 19	L.A. Lakers	W 103–93	Xavier Tillman (22)	Xavier Tillman (13)	Tyus Jones (8)	FedExForum; 17,928	1–1
3	April 22	@ L.A. Lakers	L 101–111	Ja Morant (45)	Xavier Tillman (12)	Ja Morant (13)	Crypto.com Arena; 18,997	1–2
4	April 24	@ L.A. Lakers	L 111–117 (OT)	Desmond Bane (36)	Jaren Jackson Jr. (14)	Ja Morant (7)	Crypto.com Arena; 18,997	1–3
5	April 26	L.A. Lakers	W 116–99	Desmond Bane (33)	Bane, Jackson Jr., Morant(10)	Ja Morant (7)	FedExForum; 18,117	2–3
6	April 28	@ L.A. Lakers	L 85–125	Santi Aldama (16)	Roddy, Tillman (6)	Ja Morant (6)	Crypto.com Arena; 18,997	2–4

2023 playoff schedule

== Player statistics ==
=== Regular season ===
Player	POS	GP	GS	MP	REB	AST	STL	BLK	PTS	MPG	RPG	APG	SPG	BPG	PPG
Tyus Jones	PG	80	22	1,940	200	417	83	6	823	24.3	2.5	5.2	1.0	.1	10.3
Santi Aldama	PF	77	20	1,682	371	97	45	48	696	21.8	4.8	1.3	.6	.6	9.0
Dillon Brooks	SF	73	73	2,214	244	189	65	16	1,047	30.3	3.3	2.6	.9	.2	14.3
John Konchar	SF	72	23	1,494	310	100	77	25	364	20.8	4.3	1.4	1.1	.3	5.1
David Roddy	PF	70	4	1,258	193	59	29	19	466	18.0	2.8	.8	.4	.3	6.7
Jaren Jackson Jr.	C	63	63	1,787	426	60	65	189	1,173	28.4	6.8	1.0	1.0	3.0	18.6
Ja Morant	PG	61	59	1,948	357	493	66	16	1,596	31.9	5.9	8.1	1.1	.3	26.2
Xavier Tillman	C	61	29	1,180	307	96	58	29	429	19.3	5.0	1.6	1.0	.5	7.0
Desmond Bane	SG	58	58	1,841	291	254	56	22	1,247	31.7	5.0	4.4	1.0	.4	21.5
Brandon Clarke	PF	56	8	1,090	310	72	34	37	558	19.5	5.5	1.3	.6	.7	10.0
Steven Adams	C	42	42	1,133	485	97	36	46	361	27.0	11.5	2.3	.9	1.1	8.6
Ziaire Williams	SF	37	4	561	79	35	14	6	210	15.2	2.1	.9	.4	.2	5.7
Kennedy Chandler	PG	36	0	281	38	58	12	5	78	7.8	1.1	1.6	.3	.1	2.2
Jake LaRavia	PF	35	0	414	63	21	12	4	105	11.8	1.8	.6	.3	.1	3.0
Luke Kennard^{†}	SG	24	3	590	75	54	13	1	272	24.6	3.1	2.3	.5	.0	11.3
Kenneth Lofton Jr.	PF	24	1	176	51	20	5	2	120	7.3	2.1	.8	.2	.1	5.0
Vince Williams Jr.	SG	15	1	105	15	4	6	2	30	7.0	1.0	.3	.4	.1	2.0
Danny Green^{†}	SG	3	0	43	4	2	1	0	9	14.3	1.3	.7	.3	.0	3.0
Jacob Gilyard	PG	1	0	41	4	7	3	0	3	41.0	4.0	7.0	3.0	.0	3.0

- ^{†} Denotes player spent time with another team in the season. Stats reflect time with the Grizzlies only.

=== Playoffs ===
Player	POS	GP	GS	MP	REB	AST	STL	BLK	PTS	MPG	RPG	APG	SPG	BPG	PPG
Desmond Bane	SG	6	6	231	36	19	3	0	141	38.5	6.0	3.2	.5	.0	23.5
Jaren Jackson Jr.	C	6	6	220	47	9	6	12	108	36.7	7.8	1.5	1.0	2.0	18.0
Xavier Tillman	C	6	6	183	48	19	4	4	52	30.5	8.0	3.2	.7	.7	8.7
Dillon Brooks	SF	6	6	167	18	11	1	0	63	27.8	3.0	1.8	.2	.0	10.5
Tyus Jones	PG	6	1	120	18	22	8	0	27	20.0	3.0	3.7	1.3	.0	4.5
Santi Aldama	PF	6	0	101	26	7	3	0	39	16.8	4.3	1.2	.5	.0	6.5
David Roddy	PF	6	0	76	17	4	0	2	23	12.7	2.8	.7	.0	.3	3.8
Ja Morant	PG	5	5	187	34	35	9	1	123	37.4	6.8	7.0	1.8	.2	24.6
Luke Kennard	SG	5	0	107	20	7	4	0	36	21.4	4.0	1.4	.8	.0	7.2
John Konchar	SF	5	0	49	10	4	2	2	4	9.8	2.0	.8	.4	.4	.8
Kenneth Lofton Jr.	PF	4	0	12	3	1	0	0	7	3.0	.8	.3	.0	.0	1.8
Ziaire Williams	SF	4	0	12	2	2	0	0	5	3.0	.5	.5	.0	.0	1.3

== Transactions ==
=== Trades ===
June 24, 2022	To Memphis Grizzlies Draft rights to Jake LaRavia (No. 19); 2023 MIN second-round pick	To Minnesota Timberwolves Draft rights to Walker Kessler (No. 22); Draft rights to TyTy Washington Jr. (No. 29)
June 24, 2022	To Memphis Grizzlies Danny Green; Draft rights to David Roddy (No. 23)	To Philadelphia 76ers De'Anthony Melton
June 24, 2022	To Memphis Grizzlies Draft rights to Kennedy Chandler (No. 38)	To San Antonio Spurs 2024 LAL second-round pick Cash considerations

=== Free agents ===
==== Re-signed ====
Player	Signed	Ref.
Tyus Jones	July 6	

==== Additions ====
Player	Signed	Former team	Ref.
Kenneth Lofton Jr.	Two-way contract	Louisiana Tech	

==== Subtractions ====
Player	Reason left	New team	Ref.
Yves Pons	Free agent	ASVEL	
Kyle Anderson	Free agent	Minnesota Timberwolves	
