= Taylor Jenkins =

American basketball coach (born 1984)

Milwaukee Bucks
- Position: Head coach
- League: NBA

Personal information
- Born: September 12, 1984 (age 42) Arlington, Texas, U.S.
- Listed height: 6 ft 3 in (1.91 m)

Career information
- High school: St. Mark's School (Dallas, Texas)
- College: Penn
- Coaching career: 2008–present

Career history

Coaching
- 2008–2012: Austin Toros (assistant)
- 2012–2013: Austin Toros
- 2013–2018: Atlanta Hawks (assistant)
- 2018–2019: Milwaukee Bucks (assistant)
- 2019–2025: Memphis Grizzlies
- 2026–present: Milwaukee Bucks

Career highlights
- As assistant coach: NBA D-League champion (2012)

Taylor Vetter Jenkins (born September 12, 1984) is an American professional basketball coach who is the head coach for the Milwaukee Bucks of the National Basketball Association (NBA).

== Early life and education ==
Jenkins attended the St. Mark's School of Texas in Dallas. He was a two-time captain on their basketball team, where he played as an undersized 6-foot-3-inch (1.91 m) forward. He studied at the University of Pennsylvania and earned a Bachelor's of Science in economics while concentrating in management and minoring in psychology. He did not play college basketball.

== Coaching career ==
Jenkins interned with the San Antonio Spurs basketball operations department during the 2007–08 season.

Jenkins worked as an assistant coach for the Spurs' NBA Development League affiliate, the Austin Toros, from 2008 to 2012. The Toros won the NBA D-League championship in 2012. Jenkins was appointed as head coach for the 2012–13 season and led the Toros to a 27–23 (.540) record and a first-round playoff victory over the Bakersfield Jam before falling to the Santa Cruz Warriors in the semifinals.

On July 11, 2013, Jenkins was hired as an assistant coach for the Atlanta Hawks under head coach Mike Budenholzer. The Hawks reached the playoffs four consecutive years including a trip to the NBA Eastern Conference finals in 2015. Jenkins helped develop four of the Hawks 2015 starting five into NBA All-Stars (four starters appeared on the 2015 NBA All-Star roster). Jenkins later followed Budenholzer to be an assistant for the Milwaukee Bucks during the 2018–19 NBA season. The Bucks finished with a league best 60 wins, and clinched the #1 spot in the Eastern Conference for the first time in 45 years.

His name was brought into the spotlight when an ESPN clip showed Jenkins springing up from the bench to hold the players back during a small on-court scuffle. The video led to a profile of him in The Athletic.

Jenkins also served as an assistant coach for the NBA Eastern Conference All-Star Team and NBA World Team (Rising Stars) in 2015. Also, in August 2016, Jenkins participated in the Americas Team Camp presented by Nike in Mexico City. The camp consisted of four days of basketball drills and competition conducted by NBA players and coaches.

=== Memphis Grizzlies (2019–2025) ===
On June 11, 2019, the Memphis Grizzlies hired Jenkins as their new head coach. The Memphis Commercial Appeal called the hire a "defining moment for owner Robert Pera," as well as the front office.

Jenkins was named the Western Conference's Coach of the Month in both January 2020 and December 2021. In 2022, the Grizzlies won their division for the first time in franchise history.

On June 13, 2022, the Grizzlies signed Jenkins to a multi-year contract extension.

On March 28, 2025, the Grizzlies fired Jenkins after six seasons with the team, with only nine games remaining in the 2024–25 regular season and the Grizzlies having all but secured entry into the 2025 NBA playoffs with a 44–29 record at the time.

=== Return to Milwaukee Bucks (2026–present) ===
On April 30, 2026, the Bucks hired Jenkins as their new head coach, rejoining the organization after seven years.

== Head coaching record ==
Legend
Regular season	G	Games coached	W	Games won	L	Games lost	W–L %	Win–loss %
Playoffs	PG	Playoff games	PW	Playoff wins	PL	Playoff losses	PW–L %	Playoff win–loss %

Team	Year	G	W	L	W–L%	Finish	PG	PW	PL	PW–L%	Result
Memphis	2019–20	73	34	39	.466	3rd in Southwest	—	—	—	—	Missed playoffs
Memphis	2020–21	72	38	34	.528	2nd in Southwest	5	1	4	.200	Lost in first round
Memphis	2021–22	82	56	26	.683	1st in Southwest	12	6	6	.500	Lost in conference semifinals
Memphis	2022–23	82	51	31	.622	1st in Southwest	6	2	4	.333	Lost in first round
Memphis	2023–24	82	27	55	.329	4th in Southwest	—	—	—	—	Missed playoffs
Memphis	2024–25	73	44	29	.603	(fired)	—	—	—	—	—
Career		464	250	214	.539		23	9	14	.391	
