= Desmond Bane =

American basketball player (born 1998)

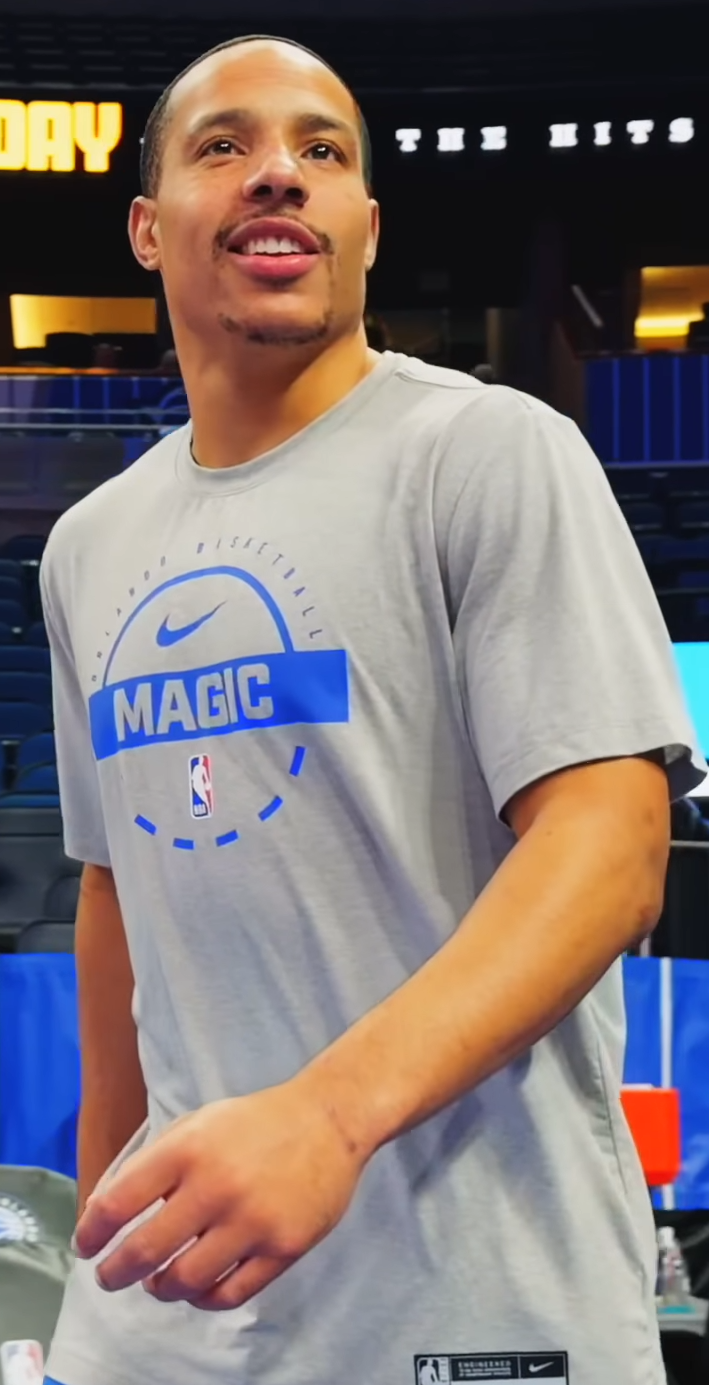
- Bane with the Orlando Magic in 2026

No. 3 – Orlando Magic
- Position: Shooting guard
- League: NBA

Personal information
- Born: June 25, 1998 (age 28) Richmond, Indiana, U.S.
- Listed height: 6 ft 6 in (1.98 m)
- Listed weight: 215 lb (98 kg)

Career information
- High school: Seton Catholic (Richmond, Indiana)
- College: TCU (2016–2020)
- NBA draft: 2020: 1st round, 30th overall pick
- Drafted by: Boston Celtics
- Playing career: 2020–present

Career history
- 2020–2025: Memphis Grizzlies
- 2025–present: Orlando Magic

Career highlights
- NBA All-Rookie Second Team (2021); NIT champion (2017); First-team All-Big 12 (2020); Second-team All-Big 12 (2019); No. 1 jersey retired by TCU Horned Frogs
- Stats at NBA.com
- Stats at Basketball Reference

Desmond Michael Bane (born June 25, 1998) is an American professional basketball player for the Orlando Magic of the National Basketball Association (NBA). He played college basketball for the TCU Horned Frogs.

A shooting guard, Bane was selected in the first round of the 2020 NBA draft with the 30th overall pick by the Boston Celtics, but was traded to the Memphis Grizzlies in November 2020 before the start of his rookie season. He was named to the NBA All-Rookie Second Team in his first year in the NBA. In June 2025, Bane was traded to the Orlando Magic.

== Early life ==
Until he was two, Desmond, his sister, and his mother, Marissa, moved often. At age two, he moved to Richmond, Indiana to live with his great-grandparents. At age 13, he discovered that his father, Etieno Ekiko, lived in Nigeria. He focused on playing baseball until eighth grade, with his great-grandfather coaching at the youth level. He also played football and soccer.

== High school career ==
Desmond Bane played basketball for Seton Catholic High School, a small private school in Richmond, Indiana. He played there under head coach Josh Jurgens. As a senior, Bane averaged a state-high 30 points, 11.5 rebounds, 6.1 assists and 3.2 blocks per game. He scored a school-record 62 points and nine three-pointers in a win over Lincoln Senior High School.

He was named MVP of the Wettig Memorial Holiday Tournament. Bane scored 1,991 points over his four-year career, surpassing 1988 Indiana Mr. Basketball winner Woody Austin for the most in Wayne County history. He did not receive an NCAA Division I offer until his senior season, when Furman offered him at the end of the November early-signing period. On May 12, 2016, Bane committed to play college basketball for Texas Christian University (TCU). He was not rated by major recruiting services 247Sports, ESPN, or Rivals.

== College career ==
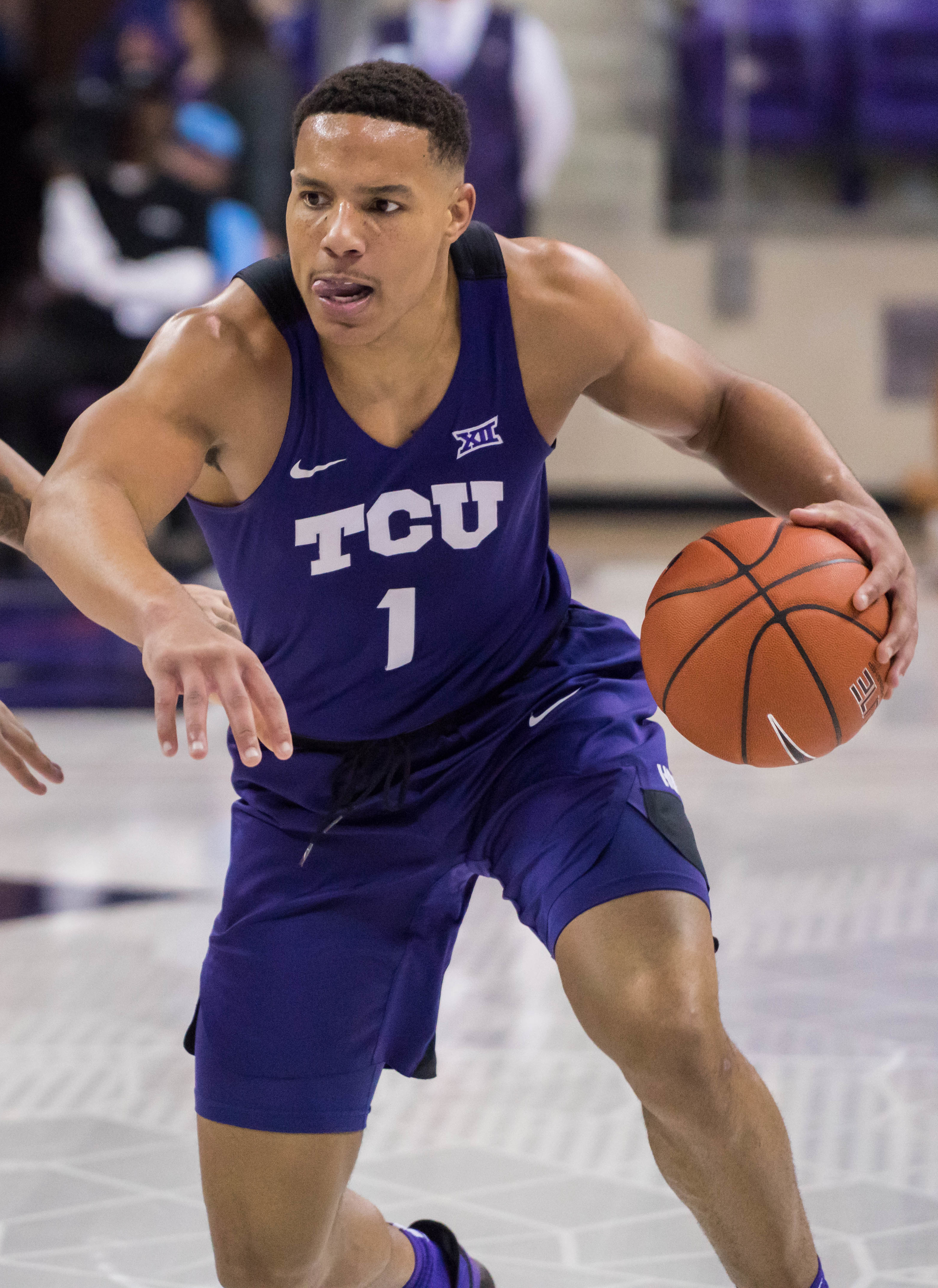
Bane with TCU in 2020

Bane earned Big 12 Newcomer of the Week honors after scoring 18 points and pulling down seven rebounds against Bradley. He had 16 points including three free throws with two seconds remaining to help TCU defeat number one-ranked Kansas, 85–82, in the quarterfinals of the Phillips 66 Big 12 Championship. Bane helped TCU win the NIT as a freshman, contributing nine points in the title game against Georgia Tech. He averaged 7.1 points and 2.9 rebounds per game and making 13 starts. In an 89–83 victory over Iowa State, Bane scored a season-high 27 points. As a sophomore, Bane averaged 12.5 points and 4.1 rebounds per game and his 47.2% three-point accuracy led the Big 12. In the NCAA tournament, Bane had five points, four rebounds, four assists, a steal and a block in the first-round loss to Syracuse. As a junior, Bane was named to the second-team All-Big 12. He had a career-high 34 points in the team's regular-season finale against Texas and scored 30 points versus Nebraska in the second round of the NIT. Bane averaged 15.2 points per game to lead the team, 5.7 rebounds per game and shot 42.5% from behind the arc. After the season, he "tested the waters" of the NBA draft but returned to TCU. As a senior, Bane was named to the first-team All-Big 12. Bane averaged 16.6 points and 6.3 rebounds per game, and his 44.2% three-point accuracy led the Big 12. On March 2, 2020, Bane was named Big 12 player of the week after scoring 23 points in a 75–72 upset over second-ranked Baylor.

== Professional career ==
=== Memphis Grizzlies (2020–2025) ===
Bane was selected with the 30th pick in the 2020 NBA draft by the Boston Celtics. He became the first TCU player to be picked in the first round since Kurt Thomas in 1995. Bane was subsequently traded to the Memphis Grizzlies for a future pick. On November 25, 2020, the Grizzlies announced that they had signed Bane. Bane was selected to the NBA All-Rookie Second Team after his rookie season. He had the highest three-point field goal percentage in a rookie season since Stephen Curry (minimum 150 attempts).

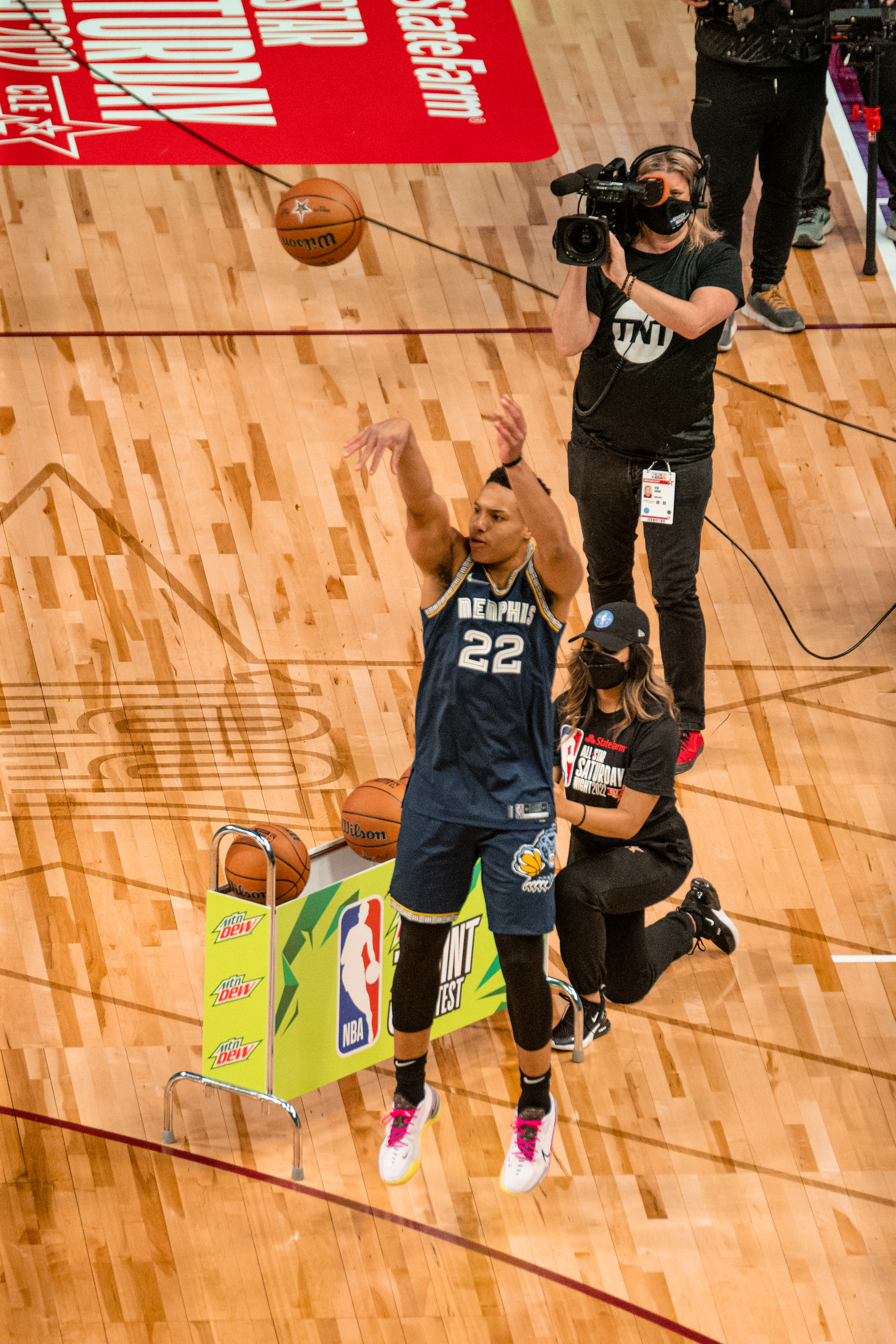
Bane with the Memphis Grizzlies in the 2022 Three-Point Contest

On December 5, 2021, Bane scored a then-career-high 29 points and had nine rebounds in a 97–90 win over the Dallas Mavericks. Bane and Tyrese Haliburton were the winners of the Clorox Clutch Challenge at the 2022 NBA All Star Weekend. On March 23, 2022, Bane set the Grizzlies' franchise record for three-pointers made in a season, surpassing Mike Miller's record set in 2007 (202).

In the first round of the 2022 NBA playoffs while facing the Minnesota Timberwolves, on April 22, Bane led Memphis in scoring with 34 points during a 119–118 Game 4 loss. On April 30, Bane scored 23 points to help the Grizzlies eliminate the Timberwolves and reach the second round of the playoffs. Bane made 27 three-pointers in the series and set a new record for most three-pointers in team history during a single postseason. The Grizzlies were eventually eliminated in six games during the second round by the Golden State Warriors, who went on to win the NBA Finals.

On October 24, 2022, Bane scored a then-career-high 38 points in a 134–124 win over the Brooklyn Nets. On November 11, during a 114–103 win over the Minnesota Timberwolves, he suffered a right foot injury. Three days later, the Grizzlies announced that Bane was diagnosed with a Grade 2 sprain of his right big toe and would be re-evaluated in 2-to-3 weeks. On December 7, the Grizzlies announced that Bane was ruled out for another three-to-four weeks with the injury. However, he made his return ahead of schedule on December 24, recording 17 points, three rebounds and two assists in a 125–100 win over the Phoenix Suns.

In game 4 of the Grizzlies' first-round playoff series against the Los Angeles Lakers, Bane scored a playoff career-high 36 points in a 117–111 overtime loss. Two days later, Bane recorded 33 points, a playoff career-high 10 rebounds and 5 assists in a 116–99 game 5 win. Memphis lost the series in 6 games. After the 2022–23 season ended, Bane signed the largest contract in Grizzlies franchise history with a new max extension deal with the Grizzlies, which clocked in at five years for $207 million.

On December 6, 2023, Bane scored a career-high 49 points, along with six rebounds and eight assists, in a 116–102 win against the Detroit Pistons. He also joined Mike Miller as the only players in Grizzlies history to put up at least 45 points, five rebounds and five assists in a game.

On October 2, 2024, Bane was a full participant in training camp after suffering a back injury in the final nine games of the 2023–2024 season. On March 3, 2025, Bane recorded his first career triple-double with 35 points, 10 rebounds and 10 assists in a 132–130 loss against the Atlanta Hawks.

=== Orlando Magic (2025–present) ===
On June 15, 2025, Bane was traded to the Orlando Magic in exchange for Kentavious Caldwell-Pope, Cole Anthony, four unprotected first-round draft picks (2025, 2026, 2028, 2030), and a 2029 first-round pick swap. He started all 82 games for the Magic during the 2025–26 NBA season, averaging 20.1 points, 4.1 rebounds, and 4.1 assists. On April 25, 2026, in Orlando's Game 3 playoff victory over the Detroit Pistons, Bane recorded 25 points on 9-of-18 shooting, including 7-of-9 three pointers; his seven three-pointers tied Dennis Scott's franchise record for made threes in a game.

== Career statistics ==
Legend
| GP | Games played | GS | Games started | MPG | Minutes per game |
| FG% | Field goal percentage | 3P% | 3-point field goal percentage | FT% | Free throw percentage |
| RPG | Rebounds per game | APG | Assists per game | SPG | Steals per game |
| BPG | Blocks per game | PPG | Points per game | **Bold** | Career high |
| * | Led the league |

=== NBA ===
==== Regular season ====
| Year | Team | GP | GS | MPG | FG% | 3P% | FT% | RPG | APG | SPG | BPG | PPG |
|---|---|---|---|---|---|---|---|---|---|---|---|---|
| 2020–21 | Memphis | 68 | 17 | 22.3 | .469 | .432 | .816 | 3.1 | 1.7 | .6 | .2 | 9.2 |
| 2021–22 | Memphis | 76 | 76 | 29.8 | .461 | **.436** | .903 | 4.4 | 2.7 | **1.2** | .4 | 18.2 |
| 2022–23 | Memphis | 58 | 58 | 31.7 | .479 | .408 | .883 | 5.0 | 4.4 | 1.0 | .4 | 21.5 |
| 2023–24 | Memphis | 42 | 42 | **34.4** | .464 | .381 | .870 | 4.4 | **5.5** | 1.0 | **.5** | **23.7** |
| 2024–25 | Memphis | 69 | 68 | 32.0 | **.484** | .392 | .894 | **6.1** | 5.3 | **1.2** | .4 | 19.2 |
| 2025–26 | Orlando | **82*** | **82*** | 33.6 | **.484** | .391 | **.908** | 4.1 | 4.1 | 1.0 | **.5** | 20.1 |
| Career | | 395 | 343 | 30.5 | .475 | .407 | .890 | 4.5 | 3.8 | 1.0 | .4 | 18.3 |

==== Playoffs ====
| Year | Team | GP | GS | MPG | FG% | 3P% | FT% | RPG | APG | SPG | BPG | PPG |
|---|---|---|---|---|---|---|---|---|---|---|---|---|
| 2021 | Memphis | 5 | 0 | 19.8 | **.579** | **.500** | — | 3.4 | 2.0 | .8 | .4 | 5.6 |
| 2022 | Memphis | **12** | **12** | 35.7 | .478 | .489 | .857 | 3.8 | 2.2 | .9 | **.8** | 18.8 |
| 2023 | Memphis | 6 | 6 | **38.6** | .422 | .320 | .931 | 6.0 | 3.2 | .5 | .0 | **23.5** |
| 2025 | Memphis | 4 | 4 | 34.8 | .317 | .219 | **.933** | **6.8** | **3.3** | .8 | .5 | 15.3 |
| 2026 | Orlando | 7 | 7 | 36.1 | .391 | .431 | .800 | 4.7 | 1.9 | **1.9** | .3 | 18.1 |
| Career | | 34 | 29 | 33.8 | .426 | .404 | .879 | 4.6 | 2.4 | 1.0 | .4 | 17.1 |

=== College ===
| Year | Team | GP | GS | MPG | FG% | 3P% | FT% | RPG | APG | SPG | BPG | PPG |
|---|---|---|---|---|---|---|---|---|---|---|---|---|
| 2016–17 | TCU | **39** | 13 | 20.7 | .515 | .380 | .768 | 2.9 | 1.0 | .3 | .2 | 7.1 |
| 2017–18 | TCU | 33 | 32 | 30.5 | **.539** | **.461** | .780 | 4.1 | 2.5 | .9 | .2 | 12.5 |
| 2018–19 | TCU | 37 | **37** | 35.5 | .502 | .425 | **.867** | 5.7 | 2.4 | 1.1 | **.5** | 15.2 |
| 2019–20 | TCU | 32 | 32 | **36.0** | .452 | .442 | .789 | **6.3** | **3.9** | **1.5** | **.5** | **16.6** |
| Career | | 141 | 114 | 30.3 | .495 | .433 | .801 | 4.7 | 2.4 | .9 | .4 | 12.7 |

== Personal life ==
Bane is a devout Catholic. He is also very involved with the youth in his home town of Richmond, Indiana.

He met his wife, Tatum Talley, during freshman orientation at Texas Christian University. The two were married in Cabo, Mexico in September 2024. They have two children.

On June 23, 2026, Bane was announced as the chief basketball officer for Texas Christian University, his alma mater.

== See also ==
- List of NBA career 3-point field goal percentage leaders
