= Santi Aldama =

Spanish basketball player (born 2001)

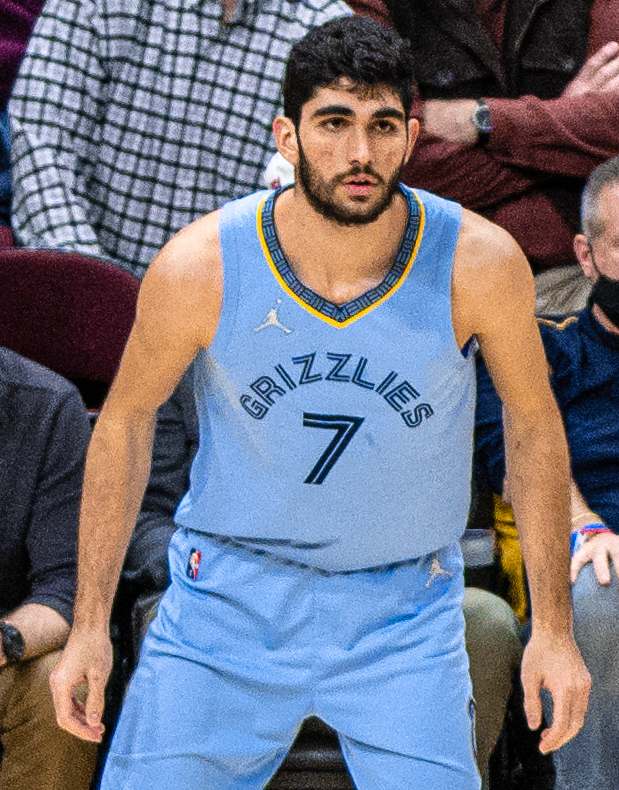
- Aldama with the Memphis Grizzlies in 2022

No. 34 – Dallas Mavericks
- Position: Power forward / center
- League: NBA

Personal information
- Born: 10 January 2001 (age 25) Las Palmas, Spain
- Listed height: 7 ft 0 in (2.13 m)
- Listed weight: 215 lb (98 kg)

Career information
- High school: Canterbury Academy (Las Palmas, Spain)
- College: Loyola (Maryland) (2019–2021)
- NBA draft: 2021: 1st round, 30th overall pick
- Drafted by: Utah Jazz
- Playing career: 2021–present

Career history
- 2021–2026: Memphis Grizzlies
- 2021–2022: →Memphis Hustle
- 2026–present: Dallas Mavericks

Career highlights
- First-team All-Patriot League (2021); Patriot League All-Rookie Team (2020); FIBA U18 European Championship MVP (2019)
- Stats at NBA.com
- Stats at Basketball Reference
Medals
Men's basketball
Representing Spain
FIBA U18 European Championship
Gold medal – first place	2019 Greece	Team

Santiago Aldama Toledo (born 10 January 2001) is a Spanish professional basketball player for the Dallas Mavericks of the National Basketball Association (NBA). He was named most valuable player (MVP) of the 2019 FIBA U18 European Championship. Aldama played college basketball for the Loyola Greyhounds. He is the son of Spanish basketball player Santiago Aldama, an Olympian at the 1992 Summer Olympics in Barcelona.

== Early life and career ==
Aldama was brought up in Las Palmas, Gran Canaria, Spain. He started playing basketball at age three because his father, Santiago Aldama, and uncle, Santi Toledo, played the sport professionally. Aldama grew up idolizing basketball players Pau Gasol, Juan Carlos Navarro and Kobe Bryant.

Since his introduction to basketball, Aldama played for Canterbury Basketball Academy in Las Palmas and later chose to remain there, despite receiving offers from bigger clubs like FC Barcelona, Real Madrid and Gran Canaria. At the 2017 Spanish Under-16 Championship, he averaged 18.9 points, 5.1 rebounds and 3.6 assists per game, playing for Canterbury alongside Oumar Ballo. He helped his team to a surprising third-place finish behind FC Barcelona and Real Madrid. In 2018, Aldama played on loan for the FC Barcelona under-18 team at Ciutat de L'Hospitalet qualifiers in the Adidas Next Generation tournament.

=== Recruiting ===
On 5 August 2019, Aldama announced his commitment to play college basketball in the United States for Loyola Maryland. He was drawn to the school because his father knew assistant coach Ivo Simović and due to Aldama's hopes of an eventual business career, and he felt comfortable when he visited the school in June. Considered a four-star recruit and a high-major talent, Aldama's decision to play for a mid-major program took many analysts by surprise. Evan Daniels of 247Sports.com called him "one of the biggest college-bound international steals in quite a while."

College recruiting
Name	Hometown	School	Height	Weight	Commit date
Santiago Aldama; PF	Las Palmas, Spain	Canterbury Academy	6 ft 10 in (2.08 m)	205 lb (93 kg)	Aug 5, 2019
Santiago Aldama; PF	Recruit ratings: 247Sports:				
Overall recruit ranking: 247Sports: 61
Note: In many cases, Scout, Rivals, 247Sports, On3, and ESPN may conflict in their listings of height and weight.; In these cases, the average was taken. ESPN grades are on a 100-point scale.; Sources: "2019 Team Ranking". Rivals.

== College career ==
Aldama missed the first three months of his freshman season with a knee injury that required surgery. He made his collegiate debut for Loyola Maryland on 1 February 2020, scoring 11 points in 17 minutes in a 79–73 win over Navy. Aldama was named Patriot League Rookie of the Week three times in the span of four weeks. At the end of the regular season, he was named to the Patriot League All-Rookie Team. On 3 March, he scored a season-high 23 points in a 78–75 loss to Lehigh in the first round of the Patriot League tournament. Aldama averaged 15.2 points, 7.6 rebounds, 2.1 assists and 1.7 blocks in 10 games as a freshman.

On 13 February 2021, Aldama posted 30 points and 22 rebounds in a 97–94 triple overtime loss to Lafayette. He set the program record and matched Adonal Foyle's Patriot League record for rebounds in a game. On 10 March 2021, Aldama scored a career-high 33 points and 12 rebounds, shooting 13-of-15 from the field, in a 67–63 win against Army at the Patriot League tournament semifinals. He helped Loyola advance to its first-ever Patriot League final. As a sophomore, he averaged 21.2 points, 10.1 rebounds, 2.3 assists and 1.7 blocks per game, earning First Team All-Patriot League honors. On 14 April 2021, Aldama declared for the 2021 NBA draft while maintaining his college eligibility. He later decided to remain in the draft.

== Professional career ==
=== Memphis Grizzlies (2021–2026) ===
Aldama was drafted with the 30th overall pick of the 2021 NBA draft by the Utah Jazz. His rights were later traded to the Memphis Grizzlies. On 8 August 2021, the Grizzlies announced that they had signed Aldama. On 2 December, Aldama scored a season-high 18 points with ten rebounds, three assists, a steal and a block in a 152–79 blowout win over the Oklahoma City Thunder.

Aldama joined the Grizzlies' 2022 NBA Summer League roster. On 18 July 2022, he was named to the All-NBA Summer League Second Team. With Jaren Jackson Jr. sidelined, Aldama was named the Grizzlies' starting power forward to open the 2022–23 season. He made his first career start in the team's season opener on 19 October, recording a double-double of 18 points and eleven rebounds in a 115–112 overtime win over the New York Knicks. On 2 February 2023, Aldama scored a career-high 21 points, alongside ten rebounds, in a 128–113 loss to the Cleveland Cavaliers.

Aldama made 65 appearances (16 starts) for Memphis during the 2024–25 NBA season, averaging 12.5 points, 6.4 rebounds, and 2.9 assists. On 26 April 2025, during the first round of the playoffs, Aldama recorded 23 points, nine rebounds and three assists in a 117–115 Game 4 loss to the Oklahoma City Thunder, eliminating the Grizzlies from the playoffs.

On 30 June 2025, Aldama re-signed with the Grizzlies on a three-year, $52.5 million contract. He made 43 appearances (11 starts) for Memphis during the 2025–26 season, recording averages of 14.0 points, 6.7 rebounds, and 2.9 assists. On 16 March 2026, Aldama underwent an arthroscopic procedure and received an orthobiologic injection to address ongoing discomfort in the trochlear compartment of his right knee; as a result, he missed the remainder of the season.

=== Dallas Mavericks (2026–present) ===
On 8 July 2026, Aldama was traded to the Dallas Mavericks as part of a six-team trade.

== National team career ==
Aldama made his national team debut for Spain at the 2017 FIBA U16 European Championship in Podgorica, Montenegro, averaging nine points and 5.4 rebounds per game. He led his team to a gold medal at the 2019 FIBA U18 European Championship in Volos, Greece, averaging 18 points, 7.6 rebounds, 2.6 assists, 2.3 blocks and 1.9 steals per game. Aldama was named tournament most valuable player (MVP) and joined his teammate Usman Garuba on the All-Star Five.

== Career statistics ==
Legend
GP	Games played	GS	Games started	MPG	Minutes per game
FG%	Field goal percentage	3P%	3-point field goal percentage	FT%	Free throw percentage
RPG	Rebounds per game	APG	Assists per game	SPG	Steals per game
BPG	Blocks per game	PPG	Points per game	**Bold**	Career high

=== NBA ===
==== Regular season ====
Year	Team	GP	GS	MPG	FG%	3P%	FT%	RPG	APG	SPG	BPG	PPG
2021–22	Memphis	32	0	11.2	.402	.125	.625	2.7	.7	.2	.3	4.1
2022–23	Memphis	**77**	20	21.8	.470	.353	**.750**	4.8	1.3	.6	.6	9.0
2023–24	Memphis	61	**35**	26.5	.435	.349	.621	5.8	2.3	.7	**.9**	10.7
2024–25	Memphis	65	16	25.5	**.483**	**.368**	.691	6.4	**2.9**	.8	.4	12.5
2025–26	Memphis	43	11	**27.9**	.479	.350	.667	**6.7**	**2.9**	**.9**	.7	**14.0**
Career		278	82	23.4	.463	.346	.686	5.4	2.1	.7	.6	10.4

==== Playoffs ====
Year	Team	GP	GS	MPG	FG%	3P%	FT%	RPG	APG	SPG	BPG	PPG
2023	Memphis	**6**	0	16.8	.455	**.467**	**1.000**	4.3	1.2	**.5**	.0	6.5
2025	Memphis	4	**1**	**30.5**	**.477**	.417	–	**6.0**	**1.8**	.0	**.3**	**13.0**
Career		10	1	22.3	.468	.436	1.000	5.0	1.4	.3	.1	9.1

=== College ===
Year	Team	GP	GS	MPG	FG%	3P%	FT%	RPG	APG	SPG	BPG	PPG
2019–20	Loyola	10	9	30.4	.459	.217	.515	7.6	2.1	.9	**1.7**	15.2
2020–21	Loyola	**17**	**17**	**35.0**	**.513**	**.368**	**.686**	**10.1**	**2.3**	**1.0**	**1.7**	**21.2**
Career		27	26	33.3	.495	.306	.639	9.2	2.2	1.0	1.7	19.0

== Personal life ==
Aldama's father, Santiago Aldama, played professional basketball in Spain and Portugal and joined the Spanish national team at the 1992 Summer Olympics. His uncle, Santi Toledo, also played professional basketball in Spain, Italy and Portugal.
