= GG Jackson =

American basketball player (born 2004)

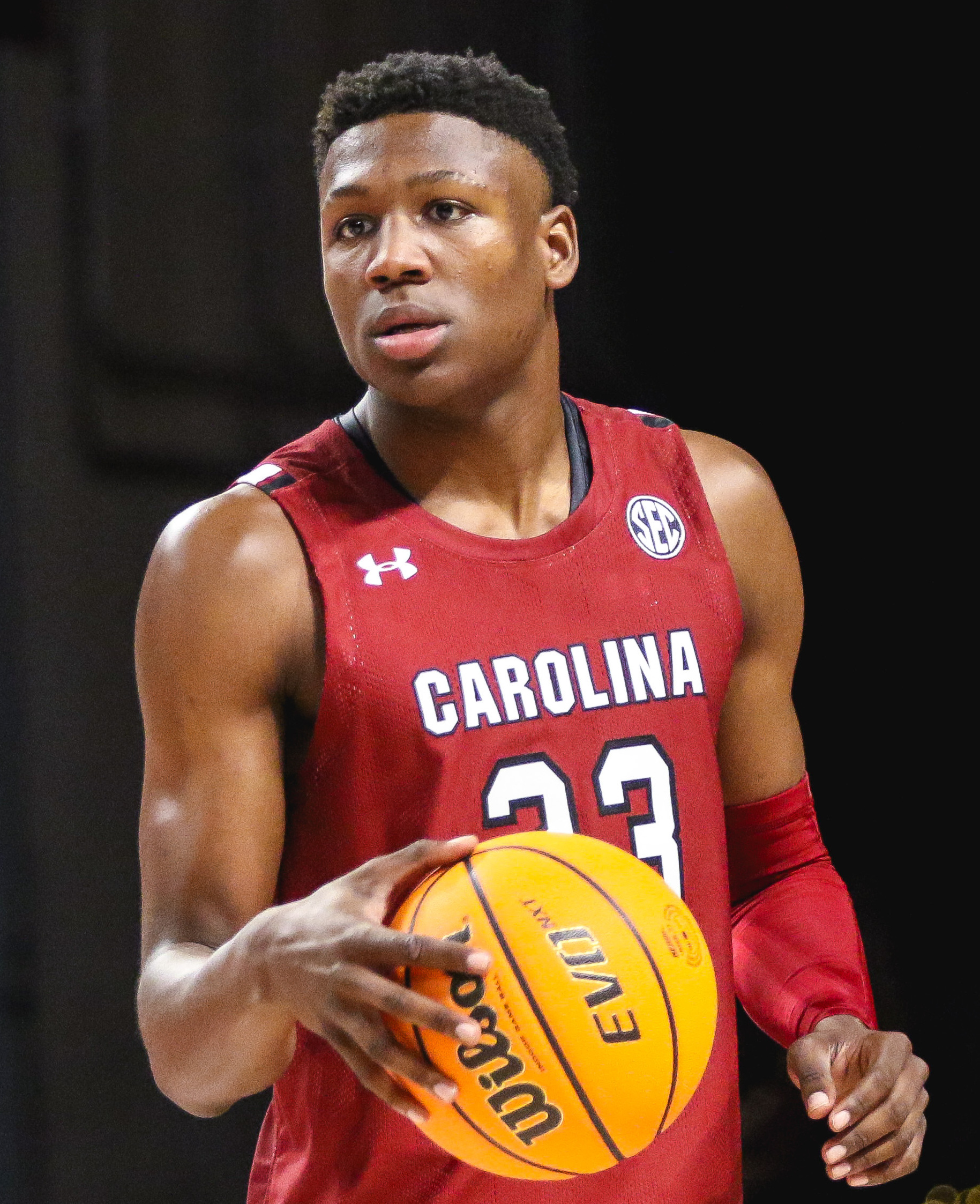
- Jackson with South Carolina in 2022

No. 45 – Memphis Grizzlies
- Position: Small forward / power forward
- League: NBA

Personal information
- Born: December 17, 2004 (age 21) Columbia, South Carolina, U.S.
- Listed height: 6 ft 9 in (2.06 m)
- Listed weight: 210 lb (95 kg)

Career information
- High school: Ridge View (Columbia, South Carolina)
- College: South Carolina (2022–2023)
- NBA draft: 2023: 2nd round, 45th overall pick
- Drafted by: Memphis Grizzlies
- Playing career: 2023–present

Career history
- 2023–present: Memphis Grizzlies
- 2023–2024; 2025: →Memphis Hustle

Career highlights
- NBA All-Rookie Second Team (2024); SEC All-Freshman Team (2023)
- Stats at NBA.com
- Stats at Basketball Reference
Medals
Men's basketball
Representing United States
FIBA Americas Under-18 Championship
Gold medal – first place	2022 Mexico	Team

Gregory "GG" Jackson II (born December 17, 2004) is an American professional basketball player for the Memphis Grizzlies of the National Basketball Association (NBA). He played college basketball for the South Carolina Gamecocks.

== Early life and high school ==
Jackson grew up in Columbia, South Carolina and attended Ridge View High School. As a sophomore, he averaged 15.8 points and 10 rebounds as Ridge View won the South Carolina Class 5A State Championship. Jackson was named the South Carolina Basketball Gatorade Player of the Year after averaging 22.1 points, 10.9 rebounds, and 2.3 blocks per game and leading the Blazers to a second straight state title in his junior season.

=== Recruitment ===
Jackson was rated a five-star recruit and was the consensus best collegiate prospect for the 2023 recruiting class. He initially committed to play college basketball at North Carolina (UNC) shortly after the conclusion of his junior season after considering offers from Auburn, Duke, Georgetown, and South Carolina. Jackson later decommitted from UNC, becoming the first player to do so since J. R. Smith in 2003. He ultimately reclassified to the class of 2022 and enrolled at South Carolina. Jackson's commitment made him the highest-ranked recruit in school history.

== College career ==
Jackson entered his freshman season at South Carolina as the Gamecocks' starting power forward. He was named the Southeastern Conference (SEC) Freshman of the Week for the first week of the season after averaging 15 points and nine rebounds in his first two career games. Jackson was benched after shooting 0-for-8 and scoring no points in an 85–42 loss to Tennessee. In the following game he scored 16 points off the bench in a 71–68 win over Kentucky. Jackson finished the season as the Gamecocks' leading scorer with 15.4 points per game. Following the end of the season he entered the 2023 NBA draft.

== Professional career ==
Jackson was selected by the Memphis Grizzlies with the 45th overall pick in the second round of the 2023 NBA draft, subsequently joining the team for the 2023 NBA Summer League. On August 31, 2023, he signed a two-way contract with the Grizzlies, splitting time with their NBA G League affiliate, the Memphis Hustle.

Extensive injuries to the Grizzlies roster during the 2023–24 season led to the team recalling Jackson from the Hustle. On February 8, 2024, Jackson scored a then-career-high 27 points during a 118–110 loss to the Chicago Bulls, which led to the Grizzlies signing Jackson to a four-year contract the following day. On March 10, Jackson made his starting debut for the Grizzlies against the Oklahoma City Thunder, where he would score 30 points in a 124–93 loss. On March 20, Jackson scored 35 points with seven three-point shots made in a 137–116 loss to the Golden State Warriors, becoming the youngest player in NBA history to make seven threes in a game. In the regular season finale on April 14, Jackson scored a career-high 44 points and recorded 12 rebounds in a 111–126 loss to the Denver Nuggets, becoming the youngest player in NBA history to record 40 points and 10 rebounds in a game. His 44 points also set the record for the most points by a rookie in Grizzlies franchise history.

On August 27, 2024, Jackson suffered a broken right foot and underwent surgery on September 4, delaying his start to the season by at least three months.

== Career statistics ==
Legend
GP	Games played	GS	Games started	MPG	Minutes per game
FG%	Field goal percentage	3P%	3-point field goal percentage	FT%	Free throw percentage
RPG	Rebounds per game	APG	Assists per game	SPG	Steals per game
BPG	Blocks per game	PPG	Points per game	**Bold**	Career high

=== NBA ===
Year	Team	GP	GS	MPG	FG%	3P%	FT%	RPG	APG	SPG	BPG	PPG
2023–24	Memphis	48	18	**25.7**	.428	**.357**	**.752**	4.1	1.2	**.6**	.5	**14.6**
2024–25	Memphis	29	3	15.8	.372	.337	.725	3.2	1.0	.4	.2	7.2
2025–26	Memphis	**55**	**28**	21.4	**.496**	.332	.742	**4.3**	**1.5**	**.6**	**.8**	12.5
Career		132	49	21.7	.447	.345	.744	4.0	1.3	.5	.6	12.1

=== College ===
Year	Team	GP	GS	MPG	FG%	3P%	FT%	RPG	APG	SPG	BPG	PPG
2022–23	South Carolina	32	29	31.9	.384	.324	.667	5.9	.8	.8	.8	15.4

== National team ==
Jackson played for the United States under-18 basketball team at the 2022 FIBA Under-18 Americas Championship.
