= Jake LaRavia =

American basketball player (born 2001)

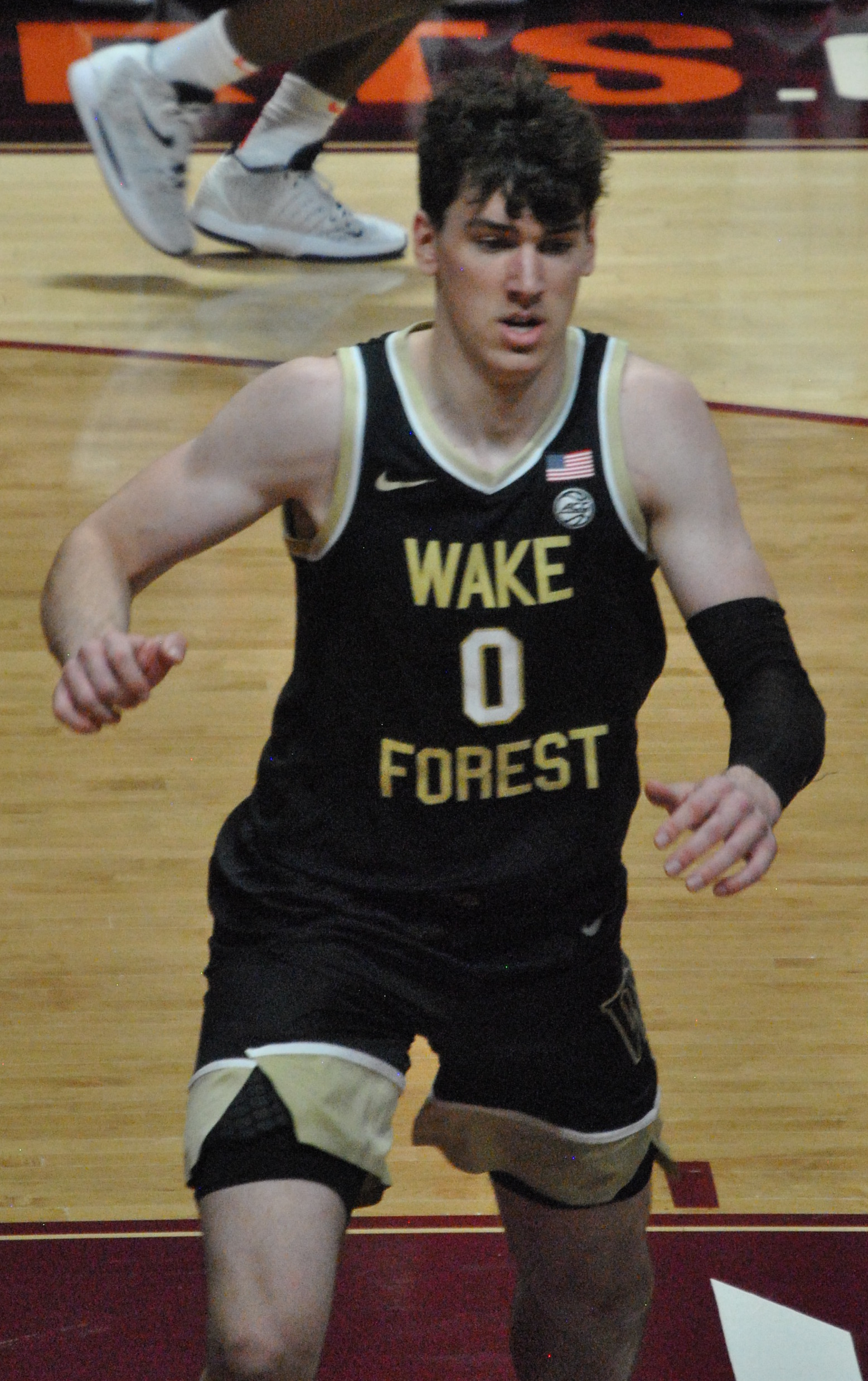
- LaRavia with Wake Forest in 2021

No. 12 – Los Angeles Lakers
- Position: Small forward / power forward
- League: NBA

Personal information
- Born: November 3, 2001 (age 24) Pasadena, California, U.S.
- Listed height: 6 ft 8 in (2.03 m)
- Listed weight: 235 lb (107 kg)

Career information
- High school: Lawrence Central (Indianapolis, Indiana)
- College: Indiana State (2019–2021); Wake Forest (2021–2022)
- NBA draft: 2022: 1st round, 19th overall pick
- Drafted by: Minnesota Timberwolves
- Playing career: 2022–present

Career history
- 2022–2025: Memphis Grizzlies
- 2022–2024: →Memphis Hustle
- 2025: Sacramento Kings
- 2025–present: Los Angeles Lakers

Career highlights
- Second-team All-ACC (2022); Second-team All-MVC (2021); MVC All-Newcomer Team (2020); MVC All-Freshman Team (2020)
- Stats at NBA.com
- Stats at Basketball Reference

Jacob Glen LaRavia (/ləˈreɪviːə/ lə-RAY-vee-ə; born November 3, 2001) is an American professional basketball player for the Los Angeles Lakers of the National Basketball Association (NBA). He played college basketball for the Indiana State Sycamores and the Wake Forest Demon Deacons.

After leading his high school team, Lawrence Central, to its first sectional title since 2012, LaRavia played two seasons of college basketball at Indiana State. With the Sycamores, he was named to the MVC All-Freshman and All-Newcomer teams as a freshman and was named to the Second-team All-MVC in his sophomore season. For his junior season, LaRavia transferred to Wake Forest and was named to the All-ACC Second Team. He was drafted 19th overall in the 2022 NBA draft by the Minnesota Timberwolves before being traded to the Memphis Grizzlies.

== Early life ==
LaRavia is the son of Jeff and Becky LaRavia. His family moved from Pasadena, California to Indianapolis when LaRavia was five years old. LaRavia played basketball for Lawrence Central High School in Indianapolis, where he was teammates with Nijel Pack and Dre Davis. He had a limited role until his senior season, in which he became the team's leading scorer. As a senior, LaRavia averaged 17.3 points, 6.8 rebounds, 3.9 assists and 2.3 steals per game, earning Indiana All-Star honors. He helped Lawrence Central win its first sectional title since 2012. LaRavia first committed to playing college basketball for SIU Edwardsville but reopened his recruitment after a coaching change. He later committed to Indiana State.

== College career ==
As a freshman at Indiana State, LaRavia averaged 9.4 points and 5.9 rebounds per game. He was named to the All-Newcomer and All-Freshman Teams in the Missouri Valley Conference (MVC). In his sophomore season, LaRavia averaged 12.3 points and 6.3 rebounds per game, earning second-team All-MVC recognition. Following the departure of coach Greg Lansing, he transferred to Wake Forest. On January 22, 2022, LaRavia recorded a career-high 31 points, 10 rebounds and four assists in a 98–76 win against North Carolina. He averaged 14.6 points, 6.6 rebounds and 3.7 assists per game as a junior. He was named to the All-Atlantic Coast Conference Second Team. On March 29, 2022, LaRavia declared for the 2022 NBA draft while maintaining his college eligibility. On June 1, 2022, he announced that he would remain in the draft and forgo his remaining college eligibility.

== Professional career ==
=== Memphis Grizzlies (2022–2025) ===
LaRavia was selected by the Minnesota Timberwolves with the 19th overall pick in the 2022 NBA draft. His draft rights were later traded to the Memphis Grizzlies, along with a future second-round pick, in exchange for the 22nd and 29th picks in the draft, which would later become Walker Kessler and TyTy Washington. LaRavia joined the Grizzlies' 2022 NBA Summer League roster. In his Summer League debut, he scored thirteen points in a 103–99 win over the Philadelphia 76ers. On October 19, 2022, LaRavia made his NBA debut, recording five points and two rebounds in a 115–112 overtime win over the New York Knicks. He was assigned to the Memphis Hustle of the NBA G League on March 23, 2023.

=== Sacramento Kings (2025) ===
On February 6, 2025, LaRavia was traded to the Sacramento Kings in a three-team trade involving the Washington Wizards in which Washington acquired Marcus Smart, Alex Len, Colby Jones, and one first-round pick while the Grizzlies received Marvin Bagley III, Johnny Davis, and two second-round picks.

=== Los Angeles Lakers (2025–present) ===
On July 6, 2025, LaRavia signed a two-year, $12 million contract with the Los Angeles Lakers. LaRavia appeared in all 82 games (including 43 starts) for Los Angeles during the 2025–26 season, recording averages of 8.2 points, 4.0 rebounds, and 1.8 assists.

== Career statistics ==
Legend
GP	Games played	GS	Games started	MPG	Minutes per game
FG%	Field goal percentage	3P%	3-point field goal percentage	FT%	Free throw percentage
RPG	Rebounds per game	APG	Assists per game	SPG	Steals per game
BPG	Blocks per game	PPG	Points per game	**Bold**	Career high
*	Led the league

=== NBA ===
==== Regular season ====
Year	Team	GP	GS	MPG	FG%	3P%	FT%	RPG	APG	SPG	BPG	PPG
2022–23	Memphis	35	0	11.8	.389	.338	.778	1.8	.6	.3	.1	3.0
2023–24	Memphis	35	6	23.0	.389	.340	**.826**	3.7	1.7	.8	.3	**10.8**
2024–25	Memphis	47	0	20.9	**.490**	**.444**	.698	**4.4**	**2.8**	.9	.4	7.3
2024–25	Sacramento	19	0	19.3	.438	.385	.579	2.8	1.3	.9	.2	6.1
2025–26	L.A. Lakers	**82***	**43**	**25.1**	.459	.321	.763	4.0	1.8	**1.3**	**.5**	8.2
Career		218	49	21.2	.441	.351	.756	3.6	1.8	.9	.4	7.4

==== Playoffs ====
Year	Team	GP	GS	MPG	FG%	3P%	FT%	RPG	APG	SPG	BPG	PPG
2026	L.A. Lakers	8	0	14.3	.333	.286	1.000	2.1	.8	.5	.8	3.3
Career		8	0	14.3	.333	.286	1.000	2.1	.8	.5	.8	3.3

=== College ===
Year	Team	GP	GS	MPG	FG%	3P%	FT%	RPG	APG	SPG	BPG	PPG
2019–20	Indiana State	30	25	24.6	.529	**.407**	.625	5.9	1.6	.5	**1.2**	9.4
2020–21	Indiana State	25	25	29.2	.473	.313	**.779**	6.3	2.3	1.5	.8	12.3
2021–22	Wake Forest	**33**	**33**	**34.2**	**.559**	.384	.777	**6.6**	**3.7**	**1.7**	1.0	**14.6**
Career		88	83	29.5	.524	.371	.743	6.3	2.6	1.2	1.0	12.2
