= Vince Williams Jr. =

American basketball player (born 2000)

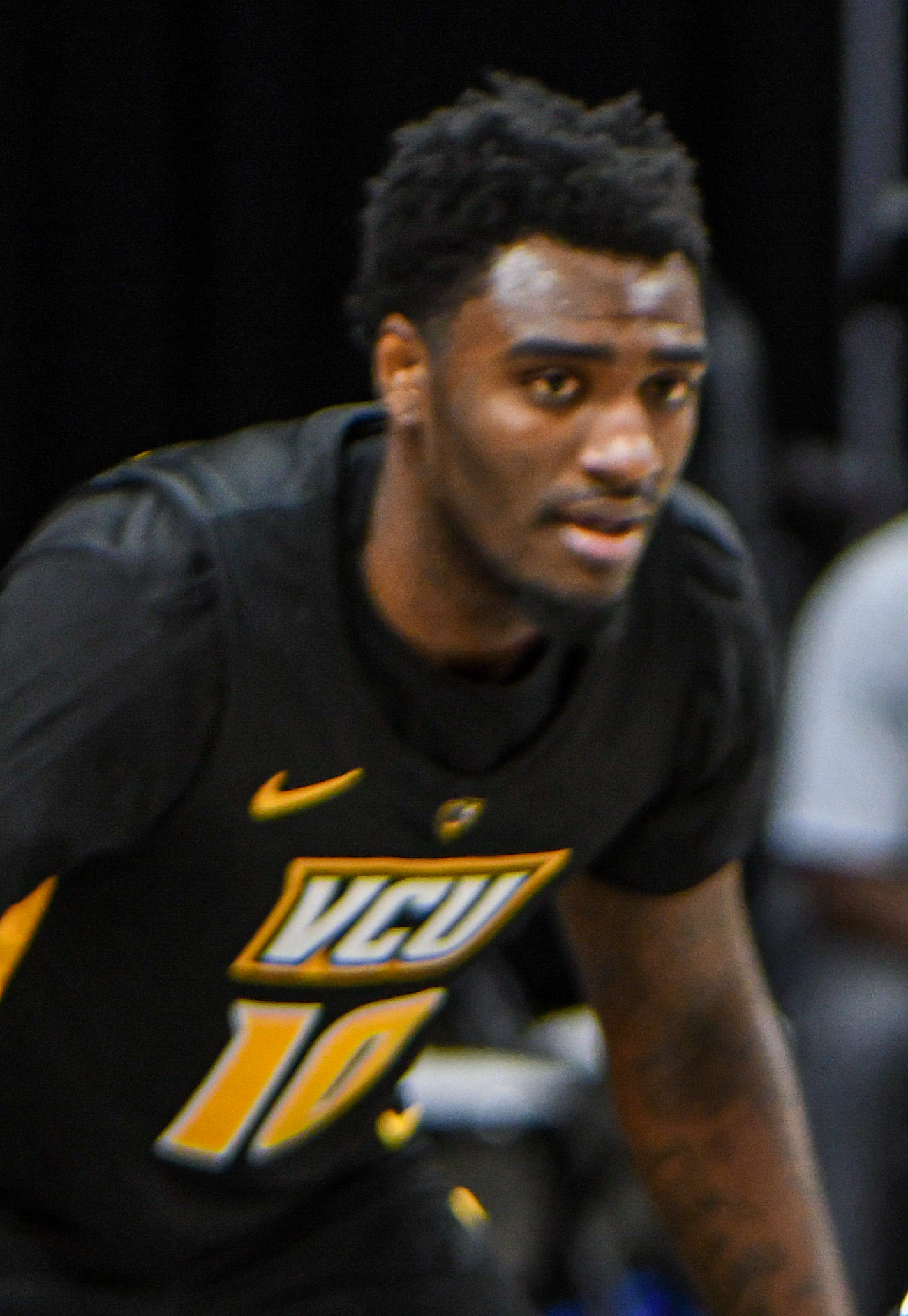
- Williams with VCU in 2020

Free agent
- Position: Shooting guard

Personal information
- Born: August 30, 2000 (age 26) Toledo, Ohio, U.S.
- Listed height: 6 ft 4 in (1.93 m)
- Listed weight: 205 lb (93 kg)

Career information
- High school: St. John's Jesuit (Toledo, Ohio)
- College: VCU (2018–2022)
- NBA draft: 2022: 2nd round, 47th overall pick
- Drafted by: Memphis Grizzlies
- Playing career: 2022–present

Career history
- 2022–2026: Memphis Grizzlies
- 2022–2024: →Memphis Hustle
- 2026: Utah Jazz

Career highlights
- First-team All-Atlantic 10 (2022); Third-team All-Atlantic 10 (2021)
- Stats at NBA.com
- Stats at Basketball Reference

Vincent Terrill Williams Jr. (born August 30, 2000) is an American professional basketball player who last played for the Utah Jazz of the National Basketball Association (NBA). He played college basketball for the VCU Rams.

== College career ==
Before his freshman season at VCU, Williams tore his labrum in his left shoulder and was sidelined until August 2018. As a freshman, he averaged 4.9 points and 3.3 rebounds per game. During the offseason, he suffered a torn right labrum that required surgery and was not fully cleared to return until early October 2019. Williams was limited to 21 games in his sophomore season due to hand and ankle injuries, averaging 4.2 points and 2.8 rebounds per game.

== Professional career ==
=== Memphis Grizzlies (2022–2026) ===
Williams was selected with the 47th overall pick in the 2022 NBA draft by the Memphis Grizzlies. On July 2, 2022, the Grizzlies signed him to a two-way contract. Williams made 15 appearances (including one start) for Memphis during his rookie campaign, posting averages of 2.0 points, 1.0 rebound, and 0.3 assists.

On January 10, 2024, Williams signed a multi-year contract with the Grizzlies. He made 52 total appearances (including 33 starts) for Memphis during the 2023–24 NBA season, averaging 10.0 points, 5.6 rebounds, and 3.4 assists.

Williams played in 27 games (including five starts) for the Grizzlies during the 2024–25 NBA season, averaging 6.6 points, 3.6 rebounds, and 2.0 assists. In the 2025–26 NBA season, Williams played in 34 games (including 12 starts) for the Grizzlies, posting averages of 8.0 points, 4.0 rebounds, and 4.4 assists.

=== Utah Jazz (2026) ===
On February 3, 2026, Williams, Jaren Jackson Jr., Jock Landale, and John Konchar were traded to the Utah Jazz in exchange for Kyle Anderson, Walter Clayton Jr., Taylor Hendricks, Georges Niang, and three first-round draft picks. On February 23, Williams suffered a season-ending left ACL tear after colliding with Houston Rockets forward Tari Eason in an away-from-the-ball play. He had averaged 4.7 points, 3.2 rebounds, and 2.7 assists across six appearance for Utah prior the injury. On March 9, Williams was waived by the Jazz.

== Career statistics ==
Legend
GP	Games played	GS	Games started	MPG	Minutes per game
FG%	Field goal percentage	3P%	3-point field goal percentage	FT%	Free throw percentage
RPG	Rebounds per game	APG	Assists per game	SPG	Steals per game
BPG	Blocks per game	PPG	Points per game	**Bold**	Career high

=== NBA ===
==== Regular season ====
Year	Team	GP	GS	MPG	FG%	3P%	FT%	RPG	APG	SPG	BPG	PPG
2022–23	Memphis	15	1	7.0	.300	.143	**1.000**	1.0	.3	.4	.1	2.0
2023–24	Memphis	**52**	**33**	**27.6**	**.446**	**.378**	.800	**5.6**	3.4	**.9**	**.7**	**10.0**
2024–25	Memphis	27	5	18.5	.401	.274	.792	3.6	2.0	.4	.3	6.6
2025–26	Memphis	34	12	21.6	.352	.308	.804	4.0	**4.4**	.8	.4	8.0
2025–26	Utah	6	0	14.0	.357	.333	.500	3.2	2.7	.3	.3	4.7
Career		134	51	21.3	.400	.322	.796	4.2	3.0	.7	.4	7.7

==== Playoffs ====
Year	Team	GP	GS	MPG	FG%	3P%	FT%	RPG	APG	SPG	BPG	PPG
2025	Memphis	3	0	12.7	.571	.571	1.000	2.3	1.3	.7	.3	4.7
Career		3	0	12.7	.571	.571	1.000	2.3	1.3	.7	.3	4.7

=== College ===
Year	Team	GP	GS	MPG	FG%	3P%	FT%	RPG	APG	SPG	BPG	PPG
2018–19	VCU	**33**	0	15.5	.459	.240	.688	3.3	1.0	1.0	.4	4.9
2019–20	VCU	21	3	16.4	.342	.200	.806	2.8	1.0	1.0	.4	4.2
2020–21	VCU	26	22	28.6	.414	**.413**	.793	5.2	2.2	1.0	.2	10.6
2021–22	VCU	30	**29**	**32.4**	**.477**	.387	**.814**	**6.0**	**3.0**	**1.6**	**1.1**	**14.1**
Career		110	54	23.4	.440	.367	.773	4.4	1.9	1.2	.5	8.6
