= 2022–23 Dallas Mavericks season =

- Head coach: Jason Kidd
- President: Nico Harrison
- General manager: Nico Harrison
- Owner: Mark Cuban
- Arena: American Airlines Center

Results
- Record: 38–44 (.463)
- Place: Division: 3rd (Southwest); Conference: 11th (Western)
- Playoff finish: Did not qualify
- Stats at Basketball Reference

Local media
- Television: Bally Sports Southwest; KEGL

The 2022–23 Dallas Mavericks season was the 43rd season of the franchise in the National Basketball Association (NBA).

Despite being 31–26 and being fifth place in the Western Conference in February, plus trading for 8-time NBA All-Star Kyrie Irving at the trade deadline, the Mavericks suffered a late-season collapse, ending the season going 7–18 and were eliminated from play-in/playoff contention for the first time since 2019 on April 7, 2023, following a 112–115 loss to the Chicago Bulls who also missed the playoffs after they lost to the eight–seeded and eventual Conference champion Miami Heat in the Play–in Tournament. It is also the first time since 2014 that Irving missed the playoffs when he was with the Cleveland Cavaliers. After the season, the Mavericks were fined $750,000 for tanking against the Chicago Bulls for trying to increase their odds in order to retain a protected top 10 draft pick.

== Draft ==
Round	Pick	Player	Position	Nationality	School
1	26	Wendell Moore Jr.	SF	United States	Duke

The Mavericks traded away their second-round pick in 2022.

== Roster ==
2022–23 Dallas Mavericks roster
Players

Pos.	No.	Player	Height	Weight	DOB	From
F	44	Dāvis Bertāns	6 ft 10 in (2.08 m)	225 lb (102 kg)	1992-11-12	Latvia
G/F	25	Reggie Bullock	6 ft 6 in (1.98 m)	205 lb (93 kg)	1991-03-16	North Carolina
G/F	77	Luka Dončić	6 ft 7 in (2.01 m)	230 lb (104 kg)	1999-02-28	Slovenia
G	8	Josh Green	6 ft 7 in (2.01 m)	200 lb (91 kg)	2000-11-16	Arizona
G/F	11	Tim Jr. Hardaway	6 ft 5 in (1.96 m)	205 lb (93 kg)	1992-03-16	Michigan
G	3	Jaden Hardy	6 ft 3 in (1.91 m)	198 lb (90 kg)	2002-07-05	Coronado HS (NV)
G/F	0	Justin Holiday	6 ft 6 in (1.98 m)	180 lb (82 kg)	1989-04-05	Washington
G	2	Kyrie Irving	6 ft 2 in (1.88 m)	195 lb (88 kg)	1992-03-23	Duke
F	42	Maxi Kleber	6 ft 10 in (2.08 m)	240 lb (109 kg)	1992-01-29	Germany
G	9	A. J. Lawson (TW)	6 ft 6 in (1.98 m)	179 lb (81 kg)	2000-07-15	South Carolina
C	00	JaVale McGee	7 ft 0 in (2.13 m)	270 lb (122 kg)	1988-01-19	Nevada
F	13	Markieff Morris	6 ft 9 in (2.06 m)	245 lb (111 kg)	1989-09-02	Kansas
G	21	Frank Ntilikina	6 ft 4 in (1.93 m)	200 lb (91 kg)	1998-07-28	France
G/F	1	Theo Pinson	6 ft 7 in (2.01 m)	212 lb (96 kg)	1995-11-05	North Carolina
C	7	Dwight Powell	6 ft 10 in (2.08 m)	240 lb (109 kg)	1991-07-20	Stanford
F/C	35	Christian Wood	6 ft 9 in (2.06 m)	214 lb (97 kg)	1995-09-27	UNLV
G	23	McKinley IV Wright (TW)	5 ft 11 in (1.80 m)	192 lb (87 kg)	1998-10-25	Colorado

Coaches
Head coach
- Jason Kidd
Assistant(s)
- Darrell Armstrong
- Quinton Crawford
- Jared Dudley
- Peter J. Patton
- God Shammgod
- Greg St. Jean
- Sean Sweeney
- Kristi Toliver

Legend
- (DP) Unsigned draft pick
- (FA) Free agent
- (S) Suspended
- (GL) On assignment to G League affiliate
- (TW) Two-way affiliate player
- Injured

Roster
Updated: February 15, 2023

== Standings ==
=== Division ===
Southwest Division	W	L	PCT	GB	Home	Road	Div	GP
y – Memphis Grizzlies	51	31	.622	–	35‍–‍6	16‍–‍25	13–3	82
pi – New Orleans Pelicans	42	40	.512	9.0	27‍–‍14	15‍–‍26	11–5	82
Dallas Mavericks	38	44	.463	13.0	23‍–‍18	15‍–‍26	9–7	82
Houston Rockets	22	60	.268	29.0	14‍–‍27	8‍–‍33	4–12	82
San Antonio Spurs	22	60	.268	29.0	14‍–‍27	8‍–‍33	3–13	82

=== Conference ===
Western Conference
#	Team	W	L	PCT	GB	GP
1	c – Denver Nuggets *	53	29	.646	–	82
2	y – Memphis Grizzlies *	51	31	.622	2.0	82
3	y – Sacramento Kings *	48	34	.585	5.0	82
4	x – Phoenix Suns	45	37	.549	8.0	82
5	x – Los Angeles Clippers	44	38	.537	9.0	82
6	x – Golden State Warriors	44	38	.537	9.0	82
7	x – Los Angeles Lakers	43	39	.524	10.0	82
8	x – Minnesota Timberwolves	42	40	.512	11.0	82
9	pi – New Orleans Pelicans	42	40	.512	11.0	82
10	pi – Oklahoma City Thunder	40	42	.488	13.0	82
11	Dallas Mavericks	38	44	.463	15.0	82
12	Utah Jazz	37	45	.451	16.0	82
13	Portland Trail Blazers	33	49	.402	20.0	82
14	Houston Rockets	22	60	.268	31.0	82
15	San Antonio Spurs	22	60	.268	31.0	82

== Game log ==
=== Pre-season ===
The schedule was announced on August 25, 2022.

2022–23 game log
Total: 2–1 (Home: 0–1; Road: 2–0)
Preseason: 2–1 (home: 0–1; road: 2–0)

Game	Date	Team	Score	High points	High rebounds	High assists	Location Attendance	Record
1	October 5	@ Oklahoma City	W 98–96	Jaden Hardy (21)	Christian Wood (13)	McKinley Wright IV (10)	BOK Center	1–0
2	October 7	Orlando	L 105–110	Christian Wood (23)	Tyler Dorsey (5)	Luka Dončić (5)	American Airlines Center; 19,360	1–1
3	October 14	@ Utah	W 115–101	Luka Dončić (24)	Christian Wood (10)	Spencer Dinwiddie (9)	Vivint Arena; 15,713	2–1

2022–23 season schedule

=== Regular season ===
The schedule was announced on August 17, 2022.

2022–23 game log
Total: 38–44 (Home: 23–17; Road: 15–27)
October: 3–3 (home: 2–1; road: 1–2)

Game	Date	Team	Score	High points	High rebounds	High assists	Location Attendance	Record
1	October 19	@ Phoenix	L 105–107	Luka Dončić (35)	Luka Dončić (9)	Luka Dončić (6)	Footprint Center; 17,071	0–1
2	October 22	Memphis	W 137–96	Luka Dončić (32)	Christian Wood (12)	Luka Dončić (10)	American Airlines Center; 20,377	1–1
3	October 25	@ New Orleans	L 111–113	Luka Dončić (37)	Luka Dončić (11)	Luka Dončić (7)	Smoothie King Center; 14,020	1–2
4	October 27	@ Brooklyn	W 129–125 (OT)	Luka Dončić (41)	Luka Dončić (11)	Luka Dončić (14)	Barclays Center; 18,039	2–2
5	October 29	Oklahoma City	L 111–117	Luka Dončić (31)	Luka Dončić (16)	Luka Dončić (10)	American Airlines Center; 20,307	2–3
6	October 30	Orlando	W 114–105	Luka Dončić (44)	Christian Wood (10)	Dinwiddie, Dončić (5)	American Airlines Center; 20,042	3–3

November : 7–7 (home: 7–2; road: 0–5)

Game	Date	Team	Score	High points	High rebounds	High assists	Location Attendance	Record
7	November 2	Utah	W 103–100	Luka Dončić (33)	Christian Wood (10)	Luka Dončić (11)	American Airlines Center; 19,877	4–3
8	November 4	Toronto	W 111–110	Luka Dončić (35)	Luka Dončić (8)	Spencer Dinwiddie (7)	American Airlines Center; 20,177	5–3
9	November 7	Brooklyn	W 96–94	Luka Dončić (36)	Dwight Powell (8)	Luka Dončić (6)	American Airlines Center; 20,011	6–3
10	November 9	@ Orlando	L 87–94	Spencer Dinwiddie (29)	Dončić, McGee (6)	Luka Dončić (6)	Amway Center; 18,165	6–4
11	November 10	@ Washington	L 105–113	Spencer Dinwiddie (33)	Luka Dončić (9)	Dinwiddie, Dončić (6)	Capital One Arena; 18,320	6–5
12	November 12	Portland	W 117–112	Luka Dončić (42)	Luka Dončić (13)	Luka Dončić (10)	American Airlines Center; 20,277	7–5
13	November 15	L.A. Clippers	W 104–101	Luka Dončić (35)	Luka Dončić (11)	Spencer Dinwiddie (6)	American Airlines Center; 19,810	8–5
14	November 16	Houston	L 92–101	Tim Hardaway Jr. (28)	Finney-Smith, Wood (8)	Spencer Dinwiddie (10)	American Airlines Center; 19,602	8–6
15	November 18	Denver	W 127–99	Luka Dončić (33)	Luka Dončić (12)	Luka Dončić (11)	American Airlines Center; 20,135	9–6
16	November 20	Denver	L 97–98	Josh Green (23)	Luka Dončić (9)	Dinwiddie, Dončić (8)	American Airlines Center; 20,244	9–7
17	November 23	@ Boston	L 112–125	Luka Dončić (42)	Christian Wood (12)	Luka Dončić (9)	TD Garden; 19,156	9–8
18	November 26	@ Toronto	L 100–105	Luka Dončić (24)	Luka Dončić (7)	Luka Dončić (9)	Scotiabank Arena; 19,800	9–9
19	November 27	@ Milwaukee	L 115–124	Luka Dončić (27)	Christian Wood (7)	Luka Dončić (12)	Fiserv Forum; 17,341	9–10
20	November 29	Golden State	W 116–113	Luka Dončić (41)	Luka Dončić (12)	Luka Dončić (12)	American Airlines Center; 20,277	10–10

December : 11–6 (home: 6–2; road: 5–4)

Game	Date	Team	Score	High points	High rebounds	High assists	Location Attendance	Record
21	December 1	@ Detroit	L 125–131 (OT)	Luka Dončić (35)	Christian Wood (8)	Luka Dončić (10)	Little Caesars Arena; 18,106	10–11
22	December 3	@ New York	W 121–100	Luka Dončić (30)	Spencer Dinwiddie (9)	Spencer Dinwiddie (9)	Madison Square Garden; 18,319	11–11
23	December 5	Phoenix	W 130–111	Luka Dončić (33)	Christian Wood (9)	Luka Dončić (8)	American Airlines Center; 20,227	12–11
24	December 6	@ Denver	W 116–115	Tim Hardaway Jr. (29)	Luka Dončić (10)	Luka Dončić (12)	Ball Arena; 19,520	13–11
25	December 9	Milwaukee	L 105–106	Luka Dončić (33)	Christian Wood (9)	Luka Dončić (11)	American Airlines Center; 20,277	13–12
26	December 10	@ Chicago	L 115–144	Spencer Dinwiddie (27)	Christian Wood (9)	Spencer Dinwiddie (8)	United Center; 19,528	13–13
27	December 12	Oklahoma City	W 121–114	Luka Dončić (38)	Luka Dončić (11)	Spencer Dinwiddie (10)	American Airlines Center; 19,877	14–13
28	December 14	Cleveland	L 90–105	Luka Dončić (30)	Christian Wood (7)	Spencer Dinwiddie (7)	American Airlines Center; 20,093	14–14
29	December 16	Portland	W 130–110	Luka Dončić (33)	Christian Wood (12)	Luka Dončić (9)	American Airlines Center; 20,191	15–14
30	December 17	@ Cleveland	L 99–100 (OT)	Kemba Walker (32)	Christian Wood (14)	Kemba Walker (7)	Rocket Mortgage FieldHouse; 19,432	15–15
31	December 19	@ Minnesota	L 106–116	Spencer Dinwiddie (20)	Christian Wood (13)	Dinwiddie, Dončić (7)	Target Center; 16,627	15–16
32	December 21	@ Minnesota	W 104–99	Luka Dončić (25)	Luka Dončić (9)	Luka Dončić (10)	Target Center; 16,164	16–16
33	December 23	@ Houston	W 112–106	Luka Dončić (50)	Luka Dončić (8)	Luka Dončić (10)	Toyota Center; 16,989	17–16
34	December 25	L.A. Lakers	W 124–115	Luka Dončić (32)	Luka Dončić (9)	Luka Dončić (9)	American Airlines Center; 20,441	18–16
35	December 27	New York	W 126–121 (OT)	Luka Dončić (60)	Luka Dončić (21)	Luka Dončić (10)	American Airlines Center; 20,377	19–16
36	December 29	Houston	W 129–114	Luka Dončić (35)	Luka Dončić (12)	Luka Dončić (13)	American Airlines Center; 20,307	20–16
37	December 31	@ San Antonio	W 126–125	Luka Dončić (51)	Christian Wood (7)	Luka Dončić (9)	AT&T Center; 18,354	21–16

January : 6–9 (home: 3–4; road: 3–5)

Game	Date	Team	Score	High points	High rebounds	High assists	Location Attendance	Record
38	January 2	@ Houston	W 111–106	Luka Dončić (39)	Luka Dončić (12)	Luka Dončić (8)	Toyota Center; 18,055	22–16
39	January 5	Boston	L 95–124	Luka Dončić (23)	Christian Wood (12)	Spencer Dinwiddie (5)	American Airlines Center; 20,413	22–17
40	January 7	New Orleans	W 127–117	Luka Dončić (34)	Luka Dončić (10)	Luka Dončić (10)	American Airlines Center; 20,300	23–17
41	January 8	@ Oklahoma City	L 109–120	Christian Wood (27)	Christian Wood (16)	Spencer Dinwiddie (8)	Paycom Center; 16,317	23–18
42	January 10	@ LA Clippers	L 101–113	Luka Dončić (43)	Luka Dončić (11)	Luka Dončić (7)	Crypto.com Arena; 15,828	23–19
43	January 12	@ L.A. Lakers	W 119–115 (2OT)	Luka Dončić (35)	Dončić, Wood (14)	Luka Dončić (13)	Crypto.com Arena; 18,997	24–19
44	January 14	@ Portland	L 119–136	Spencer Dinwiddie (25)	Luka Dončić (6)	Luka Dončić (10)	Moda Center; 19,393	24–20
45	January 15	@ Portland	L 123–140	Spencer Dinwiddie (28)	Christian Wood (16)	Spencer Dinwiddie (9)	Moda Center; 19,393	24–21
46	January 18	Atlanta	L 122–130	Luka Dončić (30)	Finney-Smith, Wood (9)	Luka Dončić (8)	American Airlines Center; 20,125	24–22
47	January 20	Miami	W 115–90	Luka Dončić (34)	Luka Dončić (12)	Luka Dončić (7)	American Airlines Center; 20,326	25–22
48	January 22	L.A. Clippers	L 98–112	Luka Dončić (29)	Luka Dončić (10)	Spencer Dinwiddie (5)	American Airlines Center; 20,026	25–23
49	January 24	Washington	L 125–126	Luka Dončić (41)	Luka Dončić (15)	Spencer Dinwiddie (8)	American Airlines Center; 20,077	25–24
50	January 26	@ Phoenix	W 99–95	Spencer Dinwiddie (36)	Dorian Finney-Smith (12)	Spencer Dinwiddie (9)	Footprint Center; 17,071	26–24
51	January 28	@ Utah	L 100–108	Spencer Dinwiddie (35)	Dorian Finney-Smith (9)	Spencer Dinwiddie (8)	Vivint Arena; 18,206	26–25
52	January 30	Detroit	W 111–105	Luka Dončić (53)	Dončić, Powell (8)	Luka Dončić (5)	American Airlines Center; 19,777	27–25

February : 5–6 (home: 2–3; road: 3–3)

Game	Date	Team	Score	High points	High rebounds	High assists	Location Attendance	Record
53	February 2	New Orleans	W 111–106	Luka Dončić (31)	Luka Dončić (8)	three players (4)	American Airlines Center; 19,670	28–25
54	February 4	@ Golden State	L 113–119	Spencer Dinwiddie (25)	Dorian Finney-Smith (9)	McKinley Wright IV (5)	Chase Center; 18,064	28–26
55	February 6	@ Utah	W 124–111	Green, Hardy (29)	Dwight Powell (16)	three players (4)	Vivint Arena; 18,206	29–26
56	February 8	@ L.A. Clippers	W 110–104	Kyrie Irving (24)	Powell, Wood (6)	Bullock, Hardaway Jr. (6)	Crypto.com Arena; 18,337	30–26
57	February 10	@ Sacramento	W 122–114	Kyrie Irving (25)	JaVale McGee (9)	Kyrie Irving (10)	Golden 1 Center; 18,111	31–26
58	February 11	@ Sacramento	L 128–133 (OT)	Kyrie Irving (28)	Luka Dončić (9)	Kyrie Irving (7)	Golden 1 Center; 18,111	31–27
59	February 13	Minnesota	L 121–124	Kyrie Irving (36)	Luka Dončić (12)	Dončić, Irving (6)	American Airlines Center; 20,325	31–28
60	February 15	@ Denver	L 109–118	Luka Dončić (37)	Dwight Powell (10)	Luka Dončić (9)	Ball Arena; 19,627	31–29
61	February 23	San Antonio	W 142–116	Luka Dončić (28)	Dwight Powell (8)	Luka Dončić (10)	American Airlines Center; 20,287	32–29
62	February 26	L.A. Lakers	L 108–111	Luka Dončić (26)	Kyrie Irving (11)	Dončić, Irving (5)	American Airlines Center; 20,411	32–30
63	February 28	Indiana	L 122–124	Luka Dončić (39)	Luka Dončić (8)	Kyrie Irving (9)	American Airlines Center; 20,277	32–31

March : 5–9 (home: 2–4; road: 3–5)

Game	Date	Team	Score	High points	High rebounds	High assists	Location Attendance	Record
64	March 2	Philadelphia	W 133–126	Luka Dončić (42)	Maxi Kleber (6)	Luka Dončić (12)	American Airlines Center; 20,002	33–31
65	March 5	Phoenix	L 126–130	Luka Dončić (34)	Luka Dončić (9)	Kyrie Irving (7)	American Airlines Center; 20,311	33–32
66	March 7	Utah	W 120–116	Kyrie Irving (33)	Luka Dončić (10)	Kyrie Irving (8)	American Airlines Center; 20,277	34–32
67	March 8	@ New Orleans	L 106–113	Kyrie Irving (27)	Christian Wood (8)	Luka Dončić (8)	Smoothie King Center; 17,473	34–33
68	March 11	@ Memphis	L 108–112	Tim Hardaway Jr. (23)	Josh Green (10)	McKinley Wright IV (5)	FedExForum; 17,794	34–34
69	March 13	Memphis	L 88–104	Jaden Hardy (28)	Jaden Hardy (8)	Josh Green (7)	American Airlines Center; 20,303	34–35
70	March 15	@ San Antonio	W 137–128 (OT)	Christian Wood (28)	Bullock, Wood (13)	Josh Green (7)	AT&T Center; 18,354	35–35
71	March 17	@ L.A. Lakers	W 111–110	Kyrie Irving (38)	Christian Wood (9)	Christian Wood (8)	Crypto.com Arena; 18,997	36–35
72	March 20	@ Memphis	L 108–112	Kyrie Irving (28)	Christian Wood (9)	Christian Wood (6)	FedExForum; 17,794	36–36
73	March 22	Golden State	L 125–127	Luka Dončić (30)	Luka Dončić (7)	Luka Dončić (17)	American Airlines Center; 20,377	36–37
74	March 24	Charlotte	L 109–117	Luka Dončić (34)	Luka Dončić (10)	Luka Dončić (8)	American Airlines Center; 20,347	36–38
75	March 26	@ Charlotte	L 104–110	Luka Dončić (40)	Luka Dončić (12)	Luka Dončić (8)	Spectrum Center; 19,264	36–39
76	March 27	@ Indiana	W 127–104	Luka Dončić (25)	Luka Dončić (7)	Dončić, Irving (6)	Gainbridge Fieldhouse; 17,022	37–39
77	March 29	@ Philadelphia	L 108–116	Luka Dončić (24)	Luka Dončić (10)	Luka Dončić (8)	Wells Fargo Center; 20,583	37–40

April : 1–4 (home: 1–2; road: 0–2)

Game	Date	Team	Score	High points	High rebounds	High assists	Location Attendance	Record
78	April 1	@ Miami	L 122–129	Luka Dončić (42)	Luka Dončić (10)	Dončić, Irving (8)	Miami-Dade Arena; 20,011	37–41
79	April 2	@ Atlanta	L 130–132 (OT)	Kyrie Irving (41)	Christian Wood (11)	Luka Dončić (7)	State Farm Arena; 17,678	37–42
80	April 5	Sacramento	W 123–119	Kyrie Irving (31)	Luka Dončić (10)	Kyrie Irving (8)	American Airlines Center; 20,271	38–42
81	April 7	Chicago	L 112–115	three players (13)	Theo Pinson (7)	Reggie Bullock (5)	American Airlines Center; 20,313	38–43
82	April 9	San Antonio	L 117–138	Jaden Hardy (25)	Theo Pinson (13)	Theo Pinson (12)	American Airlines Center; 20,141	38–44

2022–23 season schedule

== Player statistics ==
=== Regular season ===
Player	POS	GP	GS	MP	REB	AST	STL	BLK	PTS	MPG	RPG	APG	SPG	BPG	PPG
Reggie Bullock	SF	78	55	2,364	283	108	54	13	561	30.3	3.6	1.4	.7	.2	7.2
Dwight Powell	C	76	64	1,458	314	69	48	26	506	19.2	4.1	.9	.6	.3	6.7
Tim Hardaway Jr.	SF	71	45	2,152	251	129	49	12	1,019	30.3	3.5	1.8	.7	.2	14.4
Christian Wood	C	67	17	1,738	491	121	30	72	1,114	25.9	7.3	1.8	.4	1.1	16.6
Luka Dončić	PG	66	66	2,391	569	529	90	33	2,138	36.2	8.6	8.0	1.4	.5	32.4
Josh Green	SG	60	21	1,539	182	103	42	5	546	25.7	3.0	1.7	.7	.1	9.1
Spencer Dinwiddie^{†}	SG	53	53	1,808	163	279	39	16	940	34.1	3.1	5.3	.7	.3	17.7
Jaden Hardy	SG	48	5	708	89	65	17	7	420	14.8	1.9	1.4	.4	.1	8.8
Frank Ntilikina	SG	47	5	607	62	58	16	7	135	12.9	1.3	1.2	.3	.1	2.9
Dāvis Bertāns	PF	45	1	492	53	21	11	8	206	10.9	1.2	.5	.2	.2	4.6
JaVale McGee	C	42	7	355	107	11	4	26	186	8.5	2.5	.3	.1	.6	4.4
Dorian Finney-Smith^{†}	PF	40	40	1,288	188	59	38	20	365	32.2	4.7	1.5	1.0	.5	9.1
Theo Pinson	SG	40	1	323	63	46	6	1	95	8.1	1.6	1.2	.2	.0	2.4
Maxi Kleber	PF	37	5	930	135	52	12	30	220	25.1	3.6	1.4	.3	.8	5.9
McKinley Wright IV	PG	27	1	335	47	58	8	5	114	12.4	1.7	2.1	.3	.2	4.2
Kyrie Irving^{†}	SG	20	20	763	100	120	25	12	539	38.2	5.0	6.0	1.3	.6	27.0
Justin Holiday^{†}	SF	18	2	295	32	16	14	9	79	16.4	1.8	.9	.8	.5	4.4
A. J. Lawson^{†}	SG	14	0	106	20	2	2	0	54	7.6	1.4	.1	.1	.0	3.9
Kemba Walker	PG	9	1	144	16	19	2	2	72	16.0	1.8	2.1	.2	.2	8.0
Markieff Morris^{†}	PF	8	1	70	12	6	1	0	36	8.8	1.5	.8	.1	.0	4.5
Facundo Campazzo	PG	8	0	52	2	9	6	0	10	6.5	.3	1.1	.8	.0	1.3
Tyler Dorsey	SF	3	0	8	2	0	0	0	9	2.7	.7	.0	.0	.0	3.0
Chris Silva	PF	1	0	3	0	0	0	0	2	3.0	.0	.0	.0	.0	2.0

- ^{†} Denotes player spent time with another team in the season. Stats reflect time with the Mavericks only.

== Transactions ==
=== Trades ===
June 24, 2022	To Dallas Mavericks Christian Wood	To Houston Rockets Boban Marjanović; Trey Burke; Marquese Chriss; Sterling Brown
June 24, 2022	To Dallas Mavericks Jaden Hardy	To Sacramento Kings 2024 second-round pick 2028 second-round pick
February 6, 2023	To Dallas Mavericks Kyrie Irving; Markieff Morris	To Brooklyn Nets Spencer Dinwiddie; Dorian Finney-Smith; 2027 second-round pick 2029 first-round pick 2029 second-round pick

=== Contract extensions ===
Player	Signed
Maxi Kleber	September 8, 2022

=== Additions ===
Player	Signed	Former team
Tyler Dorsey	July 24	(Greece) Olympiacos
McKinley Wright IV	September 21	Iowa Wolves
Tyler Hall	September 21	Westchester Knicks
D.J. Stewart Jr.	September 21	Sioux Falls Skyforce
Mouhamadou Gueye	September 21	Pittsburgh Panthers
Marcus Bingham Jr.	September 21	Michigan State Spartans
Facundo Campazzo	October 18	Denver Nuggets
Kemba Walker	November 28	New York Knicks
A. J. Lawson	December 26	College Park Skyhawks
Chris Silva^{10}	January 31	College Park Skyhawks
Justin Holiday	February 15	Atlanta Hawks

^{10}Signed 10-day contract

=== Subtractions ===
Player	Date	New team
Marcus Bingham Jr.	October 13	
Mouhamadou Gueye	October 13	Texas Legends
Tyler Hall	October 13	Texas Legends
D.J. Stewart Jr.	October 13	Sioux Falls Skyforce
Moses Wright	July 28	(China) Zhejiang Golden Bulls
Facundo Campazzo	November 28	(Serbia) Crvena zvezda mts
Kemba Walker	January 6	(Serbia) Crvena zvezda mts

== Awards ==
Player	Award	Date awarded
Luka Dončić	Western Conference Player of the Week	December 19–25
Luka Dončić	Western Conference Player of the Week	December 26 – January 1
Luka Dončić	Western Conference Player of the Month	December
Luka Dončić	All-NBA First Team	May 10, 2023
