= Dorian Finney-Smith =

American basketball player (born 1993)

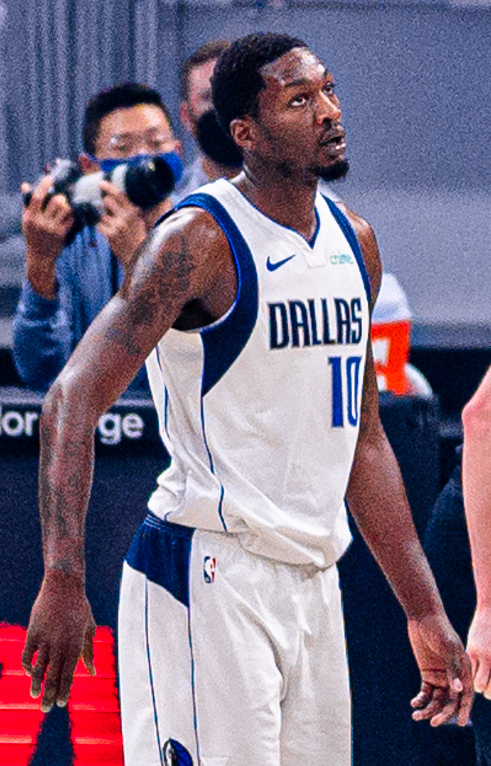
- Finney-Smith with the Dallas Mavericks in 2021

No. 8 – Atlanta Hawks
- Position: Power forward / small forward
- League: NBA

Personal information
- Born: May 4, 1993 (age 33) Portsmouth, Virginia, U.S.
- Listed height: 6 ft 7 in (2.01 m)
- Listed weight: 220 lb (100 kg)

Career information
- High school: I. C. Norcom (Portsmouth, Virginia)
- College: Virginia Tech (2011–2012); Florida (2013–2016)
- NBA draft: 2016: undrafted
- Playing career: 2016–present

Career history
- 2016–2023: Dallas Mavericks
- 2023–2024: Brooklyn Nets
- 2024–2025: Los Angeles Lakers
- 2025–2026: Houston Rockets
- 2026–present: Atlanta Hawks

Career highlights
- 2× Second-team All-SEC (2015, 2016); SEC Sixth Man of the Year (2014); ACC All-Freshman Team (2012)
- Stats at NBA.com
- Stats at Basketball Reference

Dorian Lawrence Finney-Smith (born May 4, 1993) is an American professional basketball player for the Atlanta Hawks of the National Basketball Association (NBA). He played college basketball for the Virginia Tech Hokies and Florida Gators, and was named All-SEC Second Team in 2015 and 2016 with the Gators.

After going undrafted in the 2016 NBA draft, Finney-Smith signed with the Dallas Mavericks, where he would spend seven seasons and become a full-time starter by 2019. He helped the team reach the Western Conference Finals in 2022.

Finney-Smith was traded to the Brooklyn Nets in February 2023, and then to the Los Angeles Lakers in December 2024. He signed with the Houston Rockets during the 2025 off-season, where he would spend one year before being traded to the Hawks during the 2026 off-season.

== High school career ==
Finney-Smith attended I. C. Norcom High School in Portsmouth, Virginia. As a junior in 2009–10, he averaged 19.7 points, 13 rebounds, six assists, three steals, and two blocks per game.

In September 2010, Finney-Smith committed to Virginia Tech, and later signed a National Letter of Intent with the Hokies in December.

As a senior at Norcom in 2010–11, Finney-Smith averaged 18 points, 10.7 rebounds, and 3.8 blocks per game. He led the team to back-to-back Group AAA state championships, along with Eastern Region and District titles. He recorded 19 points, 17 rebounds and three blocks in the state championship game as a senior. He finished his high school career as a two-time VHSL Class AAA Player of the Year and first-team all-state, all-region, All-Tidewater and all-district. He also earned All-Tidewater player of the year as a junior and co-player of the year as a senior.

== College career ==
As a freshman at Virginia Tech in 2011–12, Finney-Smith played in all 33 games, making 30 starts. He averaged 6.3 points and 7.0 rebounds per game and was named to the ACC All-Freshman Team. He scored a season-high 17 points in a 66–65 win over Boston College.

In June 2012, Finney-Smith transferred to Florida and was forced to sit out the 2012–13 season due to NCAA transfer regulations.

As a sophomore in 2013–14, Finney-Smith was named SEC Sixth Man of the Year, becoming just the second Gator to win the award after Chris Richard in 2007. He was Florida's leading rebounder, both in total rebounds (247) and per-game average (6.7). He also recorded the first 20/15 performance by a Gator in a road game during Billy Donovan's tenure, totaling a personal-best 22 points in an overtime win over Arkansas. He appeared in 37 games with two starting assignments, averaging 8.7 points, 6.7 rebounds, and 2.1 assists in 25.8 minutes per game.

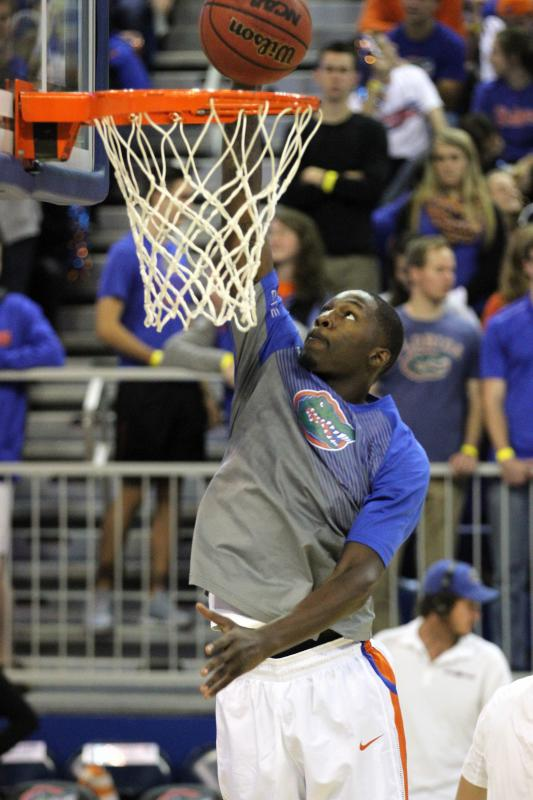
Finney-Smith dunking before a game in January 2015

As a junior in 2014–15, Finney-Smith was named second-team All-SEC by the coaches and was Florida's leading scorer (13.1), rebounder (6.2) and three-point shooter (.426). He scored a career-high 25 points in Florida's win over Jacksonville, including a 5-for-7 performance from three-point range.

As a senior in 2015–16, Finney-Smith was named second-team All-SEC by the coaches and third-team All-SEC by the Associated Press. He was Florida's leading scorer (14.7) for the second straight season and top rebounder (8.3) for the third consecutive season. He became the first Florida player to join the 1,000-point club after transferring to the school mid-tenure. His 1,220 career points at Florida rank 36th in school history.

== Professional career ==
=== Dallas Mavericks (2016–2023) ===
==== 2016–2019: Early years ====
After going undrafted in the 2016 NBA draft, Finney-Smith signed with the Dallas Mavericks on July 8, and joined the team for the 2016 NBA Summer League. Finney-Smith secured an opening-night roster spot after impressing the Mavericks during training camp and preseason. After playing less than five minutes cumulatively over the first five games of the 2016–17 season, Finney-Smith played 31 minutes on November 6 against the Milwaukee Bucks, including most of the second half and overtime. He subsequently recorded five points, three rebounds, three steals and one block in an 86–75 win. Two days later, he made his first career start, scoring five points in a 109–97 win over the Los Angeles Lakers. On December 9, he had a season-best game with career highs of 12 points and eight rebounds (equal game high) in a 111–103 win over the Indiana Pacers. On December 12, he had career highs in points and rebounds for the second straight home game, finishing with 13 points and nine boards in a 112–92 win over the Denver Nuggets.

On March 10, 2018, Finney-Smith played in his first game since November 12, 2017, after missing 51 straight games and 57 overall with left knee quadriceps tendinitis. He had seven points in 18 minutes in the Mavericks' 114–80 win over the Memphis Grizzlies. On April 6, he recorded season-highs of 15 points and ten rebounds in a 113–106 overtime loss to the Detroit Pistons.

On November 2, 2018, Finney-Smith scored a season-high 19 points, alongside seven rebounds, two assists and two steals, in a 118–106 loss to the New York Knicks.

==== 2019–2023: Starting role and contract extension ====
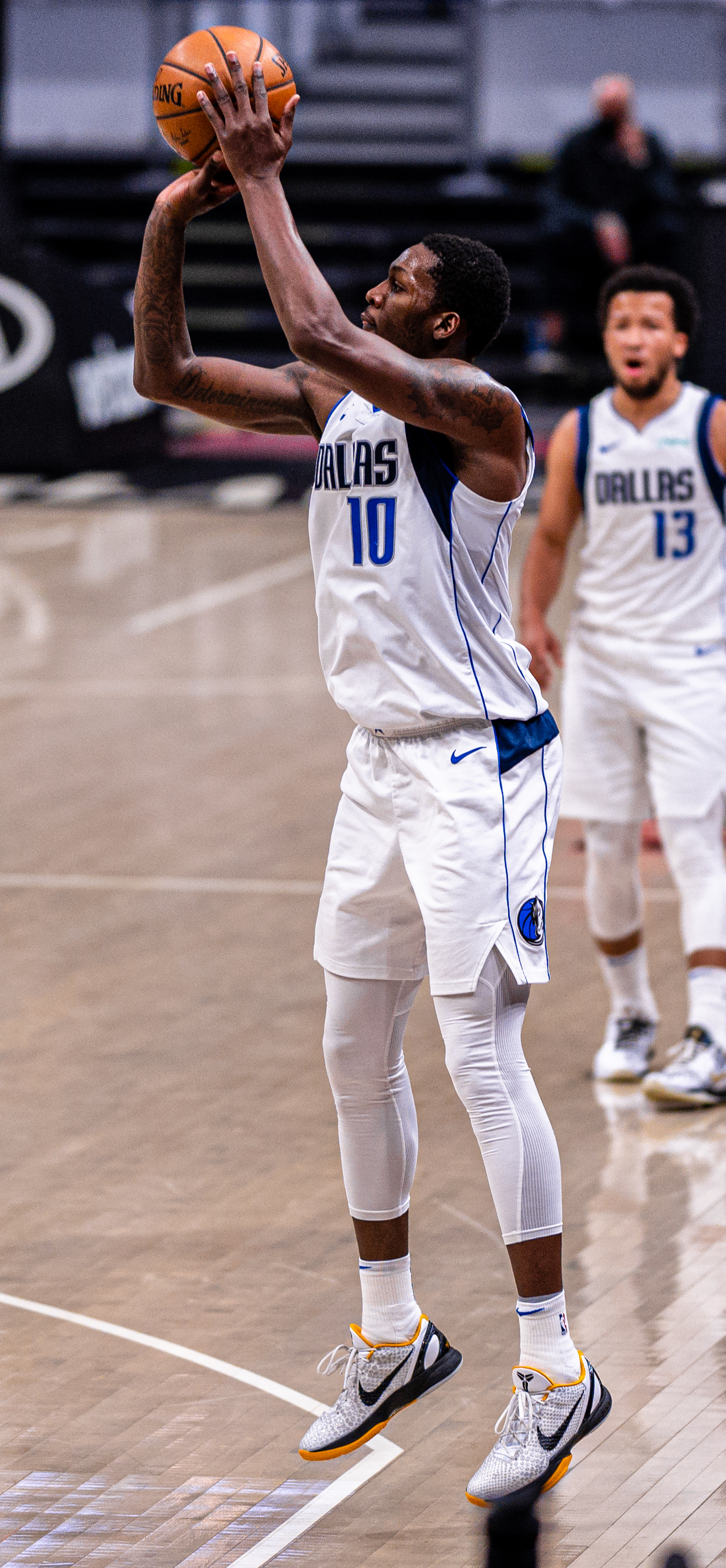
Finney-Smith shoots the ball with the Dallas Mavericks in 2021

On July 11, 2019, Finney-Smith re-signed with the Mavericks on a 3-year, $12 million contract. On November 18, he had a then-career high 22 points in a 117–110 victory over the San Antonio Spurs. On August 4, 2020, Finney-Smith grabbed a career high 16 rebounds in a 114–110 win over the Sacramento Kings. On August 8, he had a then-career high 27 points and a career high six three pointers made in a 136–132 victory against the Milwaukee Bucks. The Mavericks qualified for the postseason for the first time since 2016 and faced the Los Angeles Clippers during their first round series. Finney-Smith made his playoff debut on August 17, recording nine points, four rebounds, two assists and two steals in a 118–110 Game 1 loss. The Mavericks were eventually eliminated in six games by the Clippers.

On April 5, 2021, Finney-Smith recorded a season-high 23 points, alongside six rebounds and four assists, in a 111–103 win over the Utah Jazz. For the second straight year, the Mavericks faced the Clippers during the first round of the playoffs. On May 22, Finney-Smith recorded 18 points and five rebounds in a 113–103 Game 1 win. The Mavericks were eliminated by the Clippers in seven games, despite an 18-point, 10-rebound effort from Finney-Smith in the Mavericks' 126–111 Game 7 loss.

On February 12, 2022, Finney-Smith signed a four-year, $52 million veteran extension with the Mavericks. He scored a career-high 28 points on March 30 in a 120–112 win over the Cleveland Cavaliers. The Mavericks beat the Utah Jazz in the first round of the playoffs and advanced to face the Phoenix Suns in the second round. On May 8, during the Mavericks' second-round series against the Suns, Finney-Smith scored a playoff career-high 24 points, alongside eight three-pointers and eight rebounds, in a 111–101 Game 4 win. The Mavericks defeated the Suns in seven games, but were eliminated in a five-game series in the Western Conference Finals by the Golden State Warriors, who went on to win the NBA Finals. In Game 4 of the Conference Finals, Finney-Smith recorded 23 points, six rebounds and two assists in a 119–109 Game 4 win.

=== Brooklyn Nets (2023–2024) ===
On February 6, 2023, Finney-Smith was traded, alongside Spencer Dinwiddie, an unprotected 2029 first-round pick, and second-round picks in 2027 and 2029, to the Brooklyn Nets in exchange for Kyrie Irving and Markieff Morris.

=== Los Angeles Lakers (2024–2025) ===
On December 29, 2024, Finney-Smith was traded from the Nets alongside Shake Milton to the Los Angeles Lakers in exchange for Maxwell Lewis, D'Angelo Russell and three future second-round picks. He became a valuable 3-and-D player for the Lakers, helping them secure a No. 3 seed in the playoffs. He made 43 appearances (20 starts) for Los Angeles during the 2024–25 NBA season, averaging 7.9 points, 3.6 rebounds, and 1.4 assists. On June 12, 2025, Finney-Smith underwent surgery to repair a lingering ankle injury. On June 29, it was announced that Finney-Smith would be opting out of his $15.4 million player option Lakers contract for the 25-26 season to become an unrestricted free agent.

=== Houston Rockets (2025–2026) ===
On July 7, 2025, Finney-Smith signed a four-year, $53 million contract with the Houston Rockets. Finney-Smith made 37 total appearances (including one start) for Houston during the 2025–26 NBA season, recording averages of 3.3 points, 2.5 rebounds, and 1.0 assist.

=== Atlanta Hawks (2026–present) ===
On July 6, 2026, Finney-Smith was traded to the Charlotte Hornets alongside three second round picks (2027, 2028 and 2033) in exchange for cash considerations.

On September 22, 2026, Finney-Smith was traded to the Atlanta Hawks in exchange for Ryan Nembhard and Buddy Hield.

== NBA career statistics ==
Legend
GP	Games played	GS	Games started	MPG	Minutes per game
FG%	Field goal percentage	3P%	3-point field goal percentage	FT%	Free throw percentage
RPG	Rebounds per game	APG	Assists per game	SPG	Steals per game
BPG	Blocks per game	PPG	Points per game	**Bold**	Career high

=== Regular season ===
Year	Team	GP	GS	MPG	FG%	3P%	FT%	RPG	APG	SPG	BPG	PPG
2016–17	Dallas	**81**	35	20.3	.372	.293	.754	2.7	.8	.6	.3	4.3
2017–18	Dallas	21	13	21.3	.380	.299	.733	3.6	1.2	.5	.2	5.9
2018–19	Dallas	**81**	26	24.5	.432	.311	.709	4.8	1.2	.9	.4	7.5
2019–20	Dallas	71	68	29.9	.466	.376	.722	**5.7**	1.6	.6	.5	9.5
2020–21	Dallas	60	60	32.0	**.472**	.394	.756	5.4	1.7	.9	.4	9.8
2021–22	Dallas	80	**80**	**33.0**	.471	.395	.675	4.7	**1.9**	**1.1**	.5	**11.0**
2022–23	Dallas	40	40	32.2	.416	.355	.750	4.7	1.5	1.0	.5	9.1
2022–23	Brooklyn	26	26	27.7	.351	.306	.789	4.9	1.6	.7	**.6**	7.2
2023–24	Brooklyn	68	56	28.5	.421	.348	.717	4.7	1.6	.8	**.6**	8.5
2024–25	Brooklyn	20	20	29.0	.459	**.435**	.625	4.6	1.6	.9	**.6**	10.4
2024–25	L.A. Lakers	43	20	28.8	.442	.398	.714	3.6	1.4	.9	.3	7.9
2025–26	Houston	37	1	16.8	.333	.270	**.889**	2.5	1.0	.4	.2	3.3
Career		628	445	27.3	.433	.359	.721	4.4	1.4	.8	.4	8.0

=== Playoffs ===
Year	Team	GP	GS	MPG	FG%	3P%	FT%	RPG	APG	SPG	BPG	PPG
2020	Dallas	6	6	31.8	.442	.367	.800	5.7	**3.2**	**1.2**	**.5**	10.2
2021	Dallas	7	7	**38.7**	.406	**.432**	.800	**6.6**	2.1	1.1	.3	10.3
2022	Dallas	**18**	**18**	38.2	**.471**	.426	.708	5.5	1.9	.9	.4	**11.7**
2023	Brooklyn	4	4	25.1	.391	.412	—	4.5	.8	.8	**.5**	6.3
2025	L.A. Lakers	5	1	34.0	.414	.368	—	4.2	2.6	.2	.4	6.2
2026	Houston	4	0	12.3	.143	.182	**1.000**	2.0	.3	.3	.3	2.0
Career		44	36	33.4	.431	.401	.750	5.1	2.0	.8	.4	9.3

== Personal life ==
Finney-Smith was born to Elbert Smith and Desiree Finney-Henderson. He was nicknamed "Doe-Doe" after his paternal grandmother, Doris. In 1996, Elbert was sentenced to 44 years in prison for his role in the 1995 murder of a man in Kempsville, Virginia; he was released from prison in 2024. Finney-Smith's mother has five other children including three collegiate athletes: Ben Finney who played for the Old Dominion Monarchs, Sha-Kilya Finney who played for Maryland Eastern Shore Hawks, and Monnazjea Finney-Smith who played for the VCU Rams.

On September 13, 2008, Finney-Smith watched his older brother, Ra-Shawn Finney, as he was fatally shot seven times after a confrontation at a house party in Chesapeake, Virginia. Finney-Smith has Ra-Shawn's name tattooed across his chest.

Finney-Smith had his first child, a daughter, when he was 16 years old. He also has two sons.
