= Dāvis Bertāns =

Latvian basketball player (born 1992)

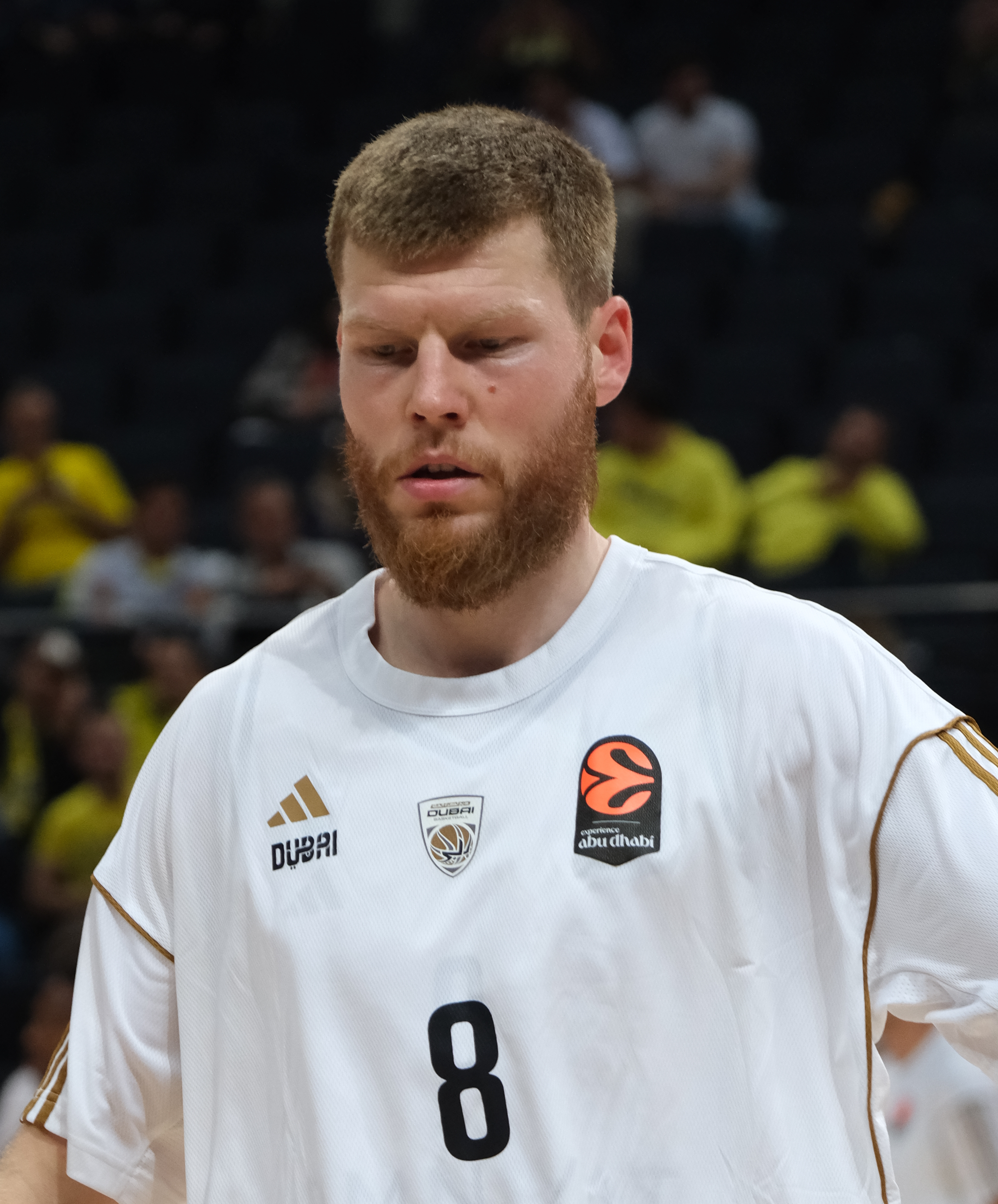
- Bertāns with Dubai Basketball in 2025

No. 8 – Dubai Basketball
- Position: Power forward / small forward
- League: ABA League; EuroLeague

Personal information
- Born: 12 November 1992 (age 34) Valmiera, Latvia
- Listed height: 6 ft 10 in (2.08 m)
- Listed weight: 225 lb (102 kg)

Career information
- NBA draft: 2011: 2nd round, 42nd overall pick
- Drafted by: Indiana Pacers
- Playing career: 2007–present

Career history
- 2007–2008: ASK Kadeti
- 2008–2010: BAA Riga
- 2009: →ASK Riga
- 2009: →Keizarmezs
- 2010: Barons
- 2010–2012: Olimpija Ljubljana
- 2012–2014: Partizan
- 2014–2016: Saski Baskonia
- 2016–2019: San Antonio Spurs
- 2016–2017: →Austin Spurs
- 2019–2022: Washington Wizards
- 2022–2023: Dallas Mavericks
- 2023–2024: Oklahoma City Thunder
- 2024: Charlotte Hornets
- 2024–present: Dubai Basketball

Career highlights
- 2× ABA League champion (2013, 2026); 3× Serbian League champion (2012–2014); Serbian Cup winner (2012); Slovenian Cup winner (2011)
- Stats at NBA.com
- Stats at Basketball Reference
Medals
Men's basketball
Representing Latvia
European U-18 Championship
| Bronze medal – third place | 2010 Latvia | U-18 Team |

Dāvis Bertāns (born 12 November 1992) is a Latvian professional basketball player for Dubai Basketball of the ABA League and the EuroLeague. Nicknamed the "Latvian Laser", he also represents the Latvian national team until 2026. He was the 42nd pick in the 2011 NBA draft by the Indiana Pacers.

== Professional career ==
=== Kadeti (2007–2008) ===
In 2007–08, Bertāns played for ASK Kadeti II.

=== Riga (2008–2010) ===
Between 2008 and 2010, Bertāns played for BAA Riga of Latvia's second division. During this time, he also had two stints in the top division with ASK Riga at the end of the 2008–09 season, and with BK Keizarmezs Riga at the start of the 2009–10 season.

=== Barons (2010) ===
Bertāns started the 2010–11 season with BK Barons.

=== Olimpija (2010–2012) ===
In November 2010, Bertāns signed a multi-year deal with Slovenian club Union Olimpija. Following the 2010–11 season, Bertāns was selected by the Indiana Pacers with the 42nd overall pick in the 2011 NBA draft. However, his rights were immediately traded to the San Antonio Spurs along with the rights to 15th overall pick Kawhi Leonard for George Hill.

=== Partizan (2012–2014) ===
In January 2012, Bertāns left Olimpija and signed a three-and-a-half-year contract with Serbian club Partizan Belgrade.

In the Serbian League finals series against Crvena zvezda in June 2013, he tore the ACL in his right knee, which sidelined him for nine months.

Bertāns returned to the court on 20 March 2014, against Maccabi Tel Aviv, helping his team get a hard-fought Euroleague Top 16 win against the favoured visitors by contributing two points, two rebounds and one assist in 15 minutes of action. Eight days later, on 28 March 2014, Dāvis scored team-high 20 points in a road Euroleague Top 16 loss to Lokomotiv-Kuban. Partizan ended the season by winning its 13th and Dāvis' third consecutive Serbian League title, defeating rivals Crvena zvezda 3–1 in the finals series. On 3 July 2014, Bertāns terminated his contract with the club.

=== Baskonia (2014–2016) ===
On 19 July 2014, Bertāns signed a three-year contract with Spanish club Laboral Kutxa Baskonia.

On 26 March 2015, in a game against Emporio Armani Milano, Bertāns tore the ACL in his right knee, the same injury that sidelined him in 2013. He was subsequently ruled out for six to eight months. Over 22 Euroleague games, he averaged 11.0 points and 2.9 rebounds per game, while also averaging 11.4 points in 25 games of the Spanish League. In Laboral Kutxa Baskonia's very next game following Bertāns's injury, a Spanish League contest versus Valencia BC, each Baskonia player wore Bertāns's number 42 in a show of support for their sidelined teammate.

On 14 July 2016, Bertāns and Baskonia agreed on a contract buyout.

=== San Antonio Spurs (2016–2019) ===
On 14 July 2016, Bertāns signed with the San Antonio Spurs. He made his debut for the Spurs in their season-opener on 25 October 2016, scoring five points in four minutes off the bench in a 129–100 win over the Golden State Warriors. On 25 November 2016, he set a career high in scoring, pitching in 15 of the Spurs' 56 bench points to help San Antonio defeat the Boston Celtics 109–103. On 7 January 2017, he scored 21 points in a 102–85 win over the Charlotte Hornets. He went 4-of-5 on three-pointers in leading the Spurs in scoring for the first time in 2016–17. On 29 January 2017, against the Dallas Mavericks, Bertāns became just the fourth Spurs rookie with at least 35 three-pointers and 15 blocks in a season, joining Kawhi Leonard, Manu Ginóbili and Lloyd Daniels. On 11 March 2017, he had three three-pointers in a 107–85 win over Golden State to reach 51 three-pointers on the season. He became just the sixth Spurs rookie to hit 50 in a season. During his rookie season, he had multiple assignments with the Austin Spurs of the NBA Development League.

Early on the 2017–18 season, Bertāns was twice assigned to the Austin Spurs. On 8 January 2018, he scored a career-high 28 points on 11-of-15 shooting with six 3-pointers in a 107–100 win over the Sacramento Kings. On 13 January 2018, he scored 18 points on a career-high six 3-pointers in a 112–80 win over the Denver Nuggets.

On 11 July 2018, Bertāns re-signed with the Spurs for two years and $14 million. On 27 January 2019, he scored a season-high 21 points in a 132–119 win over the Washington Wizards.

=== Washington Wizards (2019–2022) ===
On 6 July 2019, Bertāns was traded from the San Antonio Spurs to the Washington Wizards in a three-team deal that also included the Brooklyn Nets, in which the Spurs received DeMarre Carroll via sign-and-trade. In his first game against San Antonio following the trade, on 26 October 2019, Bertāns made all seven of his field goal attempts, including five three-pointers, and scored 23 points. On 22 November, he made six three-pointers and scored 20 points against the Charlotte Hornets.

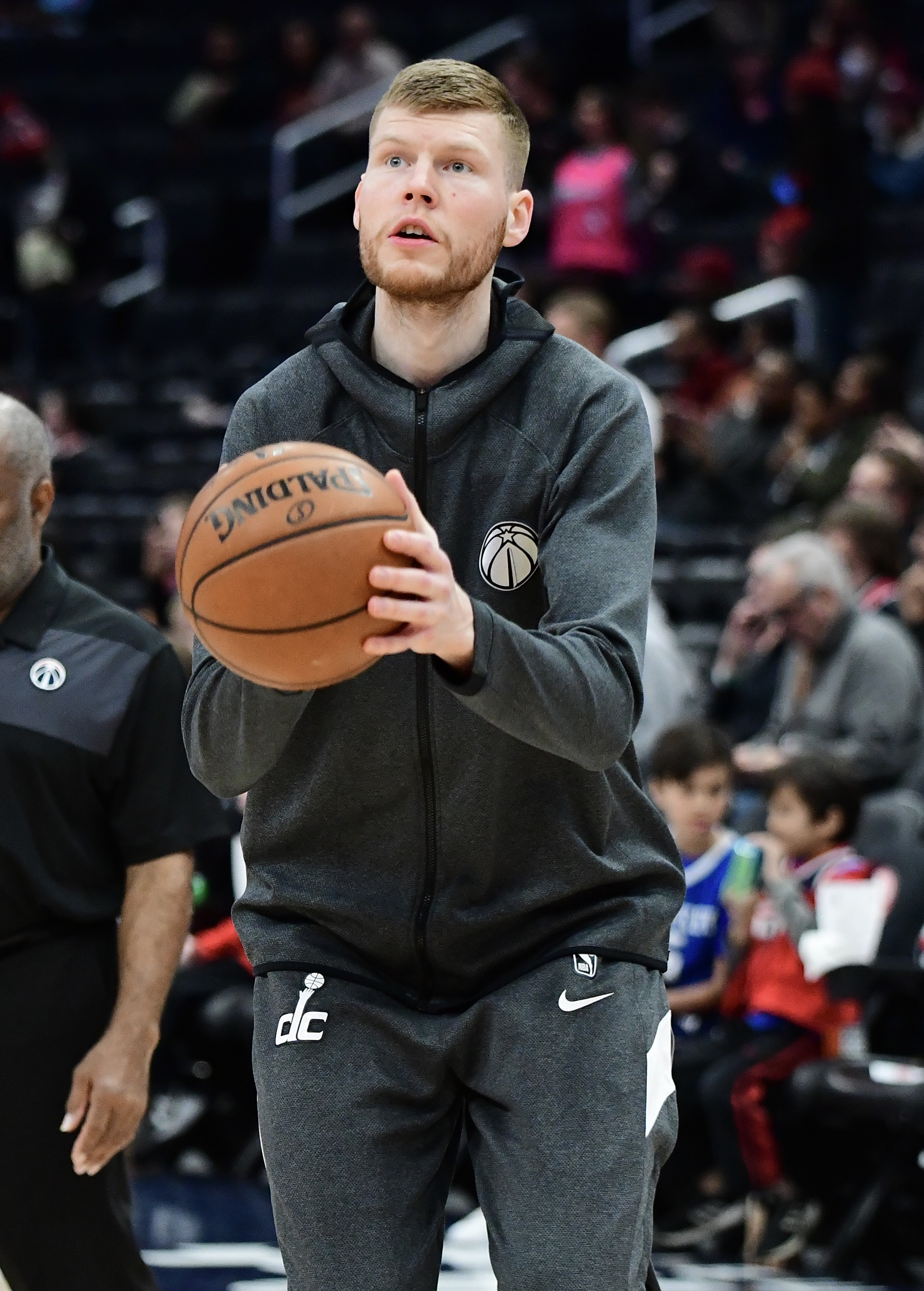
Bertāns in March 2020

On 22 June 2020, three months into the NBA's hiatus, Bertāns decided to pull out of the NBA's Orlando restart; he was the first player to do so. This decision was made for personal reasons. Bertāns was entering free agency and viewed sitting out as a preventative measure. Bertāns also had two previous ACL injuries. If the Wizards did not advance past the seeding games in Orlando, he stood to lose $520,000. The Washington Wizards fully supported Bertāns's decision and as anticipated did not ultimately qualify for the playoffs.

On 21 November 2020, Bertāns agreed to a five-year, $80 million deal with the Washington Wizards.

On 17 February 2021, Bertāns scored a career-high 35 points in a 130–128 win over the Denver Nuggets. He logged a career-best nine 3-pointers becoming the third player in team history to do so.

=== Dallas Mavericks (2022–2023) ===
On 10 February 2022, Bertāns, along with Spencer Dinwiddie, was traded to the Dallas Mavericks in exchange for Kristaps Porziņģis.

=== Oklahoma City Thunder (2023–2024) ===
On 6 July 2023, Bertāns, along with the 10th pick of the 2023 NBA draft, was traded to the Oklahoma City Thunder in exchange for the 12th pick of the draft.

=== Charlotte Hornets (2024) ===
On 8 February 2024, Bertāns was traded to the Charlotte Hornets, along with Tre Mann, Vasilije Micić, a 2024 second-round pick, a 2025 second-round pick and cash considerations, in exchange for Gordon Hayward. On 6 July, he was waived by the Hornets.

=== Dubai Basketball (2024–present) ===
On 9 September 2024, Bertāns signed with the newly created Dubai Basketball of the United Arab Emirates in the ABA League. Over 32 games, he averaged 12.2 points and 3.2 rebounds on 47.2% shooting from the field. Dubai finished the season with loss in the semifinals series to Partizan Belgrade.

== National team career ==
Bertāns represented Latvia at EuroBasket 2011, averaging 5.6 points and 2 rebounds per game. He returned for EuroBasket 2017, now in a more prominent role, averaging 14 points, 3 rebounds and 2 assists per game.

== Personal life ==
Bertāns' older brother, Dairis, is also a professional basketball player; he formerly played for the New Orleans Pelicans. Their father, Dainis, was a professional basketball player and is currently a youth coach. Their mother is a sports teacher and a former high-level rower. During his childhood, Bertāns was raised in Latvia's northernmost town, Rūjiena, until his parents moved to Rīga, Latvia's capital. Bertāns is fluent in the Serbian language.

Due to a childhood wood-cutting accident, Bertāns is missing part of the ring finger on his right hand.

Bertāns is a former vegan who currently eats a dairy-free pescatarian diet; having difficulty with finding good vegan food when traveling with his team influenced Bertāns' decision to change his diet.

== Career statistics ==
Legend
| GP | Games played | GS | Games started | MPG | Minutes per game |
| FG% | Field-goal percentage | 3P% | 3-point field-goal percentage | FT% | Free-throw percentage |
| RPG | Rebounds per game | APG | Assists per game | SPG | Steals per game |
| BPG | Blocks per game | PPG | Points per game | PIR | Performance index rating |
| **Bold** | Career high |

=== NBA ===
==== Regular season ====
| Year | Team | GP | GS | MPG | FG% | 3P% | FT% | RPG | APG | SPG | BPG | PPG |
|---|---|---|---|---|---|---|---|---|---|---|---|---|
| 2016–17 | San Antonio | 67 | 6 | 12.1 | .440 | .399 | .824 | 1.5 | .7 | .3 | .4 | 4.5 |
| 2017–18 | San Antonio | **77** | 10 | 14.1 | .440 | .373 | .816 | 2.0 | 1.0 | .3 | .4 | 5.9 |
| 2018–19 | San Antonio | 76 | **12** | 21.5 | **.450** | **.429** | .883 | 3.5 | 1.3 | .5 | .4 | 8.0 |
| 2019–20 | Washington | 54 | 4 | **29.3** | .434 | .424 | .852 | **4.5** | **1.7** | .7 | **.6** | **15.4** |
| 2020–21 | Washington | 57 | 7 | 25.7 | .404 | .395 | .870 | 2.9 | .9 | .6 | .2 | 11.5 |
| 2021–22 | Washington | 34 | 0 | 14.7 | .351 | .319 | **.933** | 1.8 | .5 | .3 | .2 | 5.7 |
| 2021–22 | Dallas | 22 | 0 | 13.9 | .375 | .360 | .800 | 2.5 | .7 | .3 | .3 | 5.3 |
| 2022–23 | Dallas | 45 | 1 | 10.9 | .431 | .390 | .867 | 1.2 | .5 | .2 | .2 | 4.6 |
| 2023–24 | Oklahoma City | 15 | 0 | 6.1 | .385 | .417 | **.933** | .7 | .6 | .2 | .2 | 2.9 |
| 2023–24 | Charlotte | 28 | 1 | 20.8 | .394 | .375 | .889 | 1.8 | .9 | **.8** | .3 | 8.8 |
| Career | | 475 | 41 | 18.0 | .422 | .396 | .863 | 2.4 | .9 | .4 | .4 | 7.7 |

==== Playoffs ====
| Year | Team | GP | GS | MPG | FG% | 3P% | FT% | RPG | APG | SPG | BPG | PPG |
|---|---|---|---|---|---|---|---|---|---|---|---|---|
| 2017 | San Antonio | 13 | 0 | 8.6 | **.444** | **.400** | .667 | 1.5 | .2 | .2 | .3 | 2.8 |
| 2018 | San Antonio | 5 | 0 | 16.4 | .167 | .188 | .727 | 2.2 | **1.2** | **.4** | .0 | 3.4 |
| 2019 | San Antonio | 5 | 0 | 15.8 | .333 | .273 | .600 | 1.6 | 1.0 | .0 | .2 | 3.2 |
| 2021 | Washington | 4 | **2** | **26.5** | .407 | .348 | **1.000** | **2.8** | .3 | .3 | **.5** | **9.3** |
| 2022 | Dallas | **18** | 0 | 10.7 | .400 | .373 | .833 | 1.4 | .3 | **.4** | .1 | 4.1 |
| Career | | 45 | 2 | 12.7 | .373 | .339 | .780 | 1.7 | .5 | .3 | .2 | 4.0 |

=== EuroLeague ===
| Year | Team | GP | GS | MPG | FG% | 3P% | FT% | RPG | APG | SPG | BPG | PPG | PIR |
|---|---|---|---|---|---|---|---|---|---|---|---|---|---|
| 2011–12 | Union Olimpija | 10 | 1 | 15.6 | .282 | .217 | **1.000** | 2.2 | .5 | .1 | .1 | 3.0 | .6 |
| 2012–13 | Partizan | 10 | 1 | 20.0 | .385 | .471 | .625 | 2.3 | .7 | **1.1** | .2 | 6.6 | 4.6 |
| 2013–14 | Partizan | 4 | 2 | **21.9** | .435 | .435 | — | **3.8** | **1.3** | .8 | **.5** | **12.5** | **8.0** |
| 2014–15 | Baskonia | **22** | **18** | 21.8 | .381 | .355 | .853 | 2.9 | .9 | .2 | **.5** | 11.0 | 6.5 |
| 2015–16 | Baskonia | 15 | 8 | 20.7 | **.514** | **.474** | .905 | 1.9 | .9 | .4 | .4 | 7.9 | 6.9 |
| Career | | 61 | 30 | 20.2 | .400 | .388 | .824 | 2.5 | .8 | .4 | .4 | 8.3 | 5.4 |

== See also ==
- List of NBA single-season 3-point scoring leaders
