= Dwight Powell =

Canadian basketball player (born 1991)

- Powell with Fenerbahçe in 2026

No. 16 – Fenerbahçe
- Position: Centre / power forward
- League: BSL; EuroLeague

Personal information
- Born: July 20, 1991 (age 35) Toronto, Ontario, Canada
- Listed height: 6 ft 11 in (2.11 m)
- Listed weight: 240 lb (109 kg)

Career information
- High school: IMG Academy (Bradenton, Florida)
- College: Stanford (2010–2014)
- NBA draft: 2014: 2nd round, 45th overall pick
- Drafted by: Charlotte Hornets
- Playing career: 2014–present

Career history
- 2014: Boston Celtics
- 2014: →Maine Red Claws
- 2014–2026: Dallas Mavericks
- 2014–2015: →Texas Legends
- 2026–present: Fenerbahçe

Career highlights
- 2× First-team All-Pac-12 (2013, 2014); Pac-12 Most Improved Player (2013); NIT champion (2012); Pac-10 All-Freshman team (2011)
- Stats at NBA.com
- Stats at Basketball Reference
Medals
Men's basketball
Representing Canada
FIBA World Cup
Bronze medal – third place	2023 Philippines–Japan–Indonesia
FIBA AmeriCup
Bronze medal – third place	2015 Mexico

Dwight Harlan Powell (born July 20, 1991) is a Canadian professional basketball player for Fenerbahçe of the Turkish Basketbol Süper Ligi (BSL) and the EuroLeague. He played college basketball for the Stanford Cardinal and is a member of the Canadian national team.

== High school career ==
Powell was born in Toronto, Ontario to a white Canadian father and Jamaican mother. He then moved to the U.S. and attended IMG Academy in Bradenton, Florida. As a senior, he averaged 23.2 points, 11.6 rebounds, 4.4 assists and 2.3 blocks per game.

Considered a five-star recruit by Rivals.com, Powell was listed as the No. 8 power forward and the No. 25 player in the nation in 2010.

== College career ==
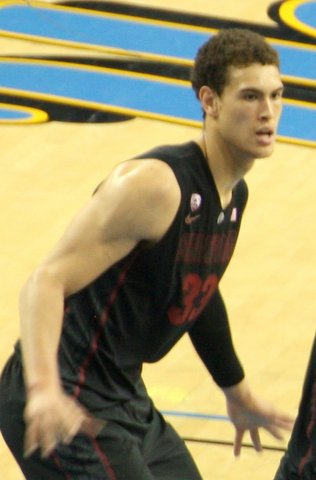
Powell with Stanford in 2014

As a freshman at Stanford University in 2010–11, Powell earned Pac-10 All-Freshman Team honours. He started in 26 of 31 games, averaging 8.1 points and 5.2 rebounds per game.

As a sophomore in 2011–12, the Cardinal won the NIT championship, and Powell earned Pac-12 All-Academic Honorable Mention selection. He started in 11 of 35 games, logging an average of 5.8 points and 4.6 rebounds per game.

As a junior in 2012–13, Powell earned second-team NABC All-District, first-team All-Pac-12, and Pac-12 All-Academic second-team honours. He was also named the Pac-12 Most Improved Player of the Year. Powell started in all 34 games, averaging 14.9 points to go with 8.4 rebounds per game.

As a senior in 2013–14, Powell earned first-team All-Pac-12 honours for the second straight year and was named to the NCAA All-South Regional Team. He was also named the Pac-12 Scholar-Athlete of the Year and a Pac-12 All-Academic Honorable Mention selection. Powell started in all 36 games, putting up an average of 14.0 points and 6.9 rebounds per game.

== Professional career ==
=== Boston Celtics (2014) ===
On June 26, 2014, Powell was selected with the 45th overall pick in the 2014 NBA draft by the Charlotte Hornets. On July 12, Powell's rights were traded, along with Brendan Haywood, to the Cleveland Cavaliers in exchange for Scotty Hopson and cash considerations. He then joined the Cavaliers for the NBA Summer League and signed with them on August 23. On September 25, he was traded, along with John Lucas III, Erik Murphy, Malcolm Thomas and the Cavaliers' 2016 and 2017 second-round picks, to the Boston Celtics in exchange for Keith Bogans and two future second-round picks. During his time with the Celtics, he was assigned multiple times to the Maine Red Claws of the NBA Development League.

=== Dallas Mavericks (2014–2026) ===
On December 18, 2014, Powell was traded, along with Rajon Rondo, to the Dallas Mavericks in exchange for Jae Crowder, Jameer Nelson, Brandan Wright, a 2015 first-round pick and a 2016 second-round pick. On January 14, 2015, he scored a season-high 11 points on 5-for-7 shooting in a loss to the Denver Nuggets. He was assigned multiple times to the Texas Legends during his rookie season.

In July 2015, Powell joined the Mavericks for the 2015 NBA Summer League. On November 3, 2015, he recorded his first career double-double with 10 points and 10 rebounds in a loss to the Toronto Raptors. Four days later, he recorded a then career-high 15 points and 7 rebounds in a 107–98 win over the New Orleans Pelicans. He tied his career high of 15 points on January 17, 2016, in a loss to the San Antonio Spurs. On March 28, 2016, Powell made his first NBA start and scored a career-high 16 points in a 97–88 win over the Denver Nuggets.

On July 8, 2016, Powell re-signed with the Mavericks. On December 3, 2016, he set a new career high with 17 points in a 107–82 win over the Chicago Bulls. On April 9, 2017, he scored 21 points against the Phoenix Suns.

On January 3, 2018, Powell tied his career high with 21 points in a 125–122 loss to the Golden State Warriors. On February 28, 2018, he again tied his career high with 21 points in a 111–110 overtime loss to the Oklahoma City Thunder.

On March 6, 2019, Powell set a career high with 26 points in a 132–123 loss to the Washington Wizards. On April 3, 2019, he scored 25 points in a 110–108 loss to the Minnesota Timberwolves.

After exercising his option for the 2019–20 season, he signed a contract extension with the Mavericks on July 6, 2019.

On December 4, 2019, Powell set a season-high 24 points while recording five rebounds, four assists, one steal and two blocks in a 121–114 win against the Minnesota Timberwolves. He had a perfect shooting night, going 9 of 9 from the field and 2 of 2 from the three-point line. Once the fourth quarter started, Powell experienced a left arm injury and got ruled out of the game.

On January 21, 2020, in a game against the Los Angeles Clippers, Powell suffered a season-ending Achilles tendon injury while attempting to drive to the basket.

Powell was one of only 4 other players in the NBA to play all 82 games in a season in the 2021–22 NBA season, as well as breaking the Mavericks franchise record for most consecutive field goals made with 18 in a stretch of 4 games.

On July 9, 2023, Powell re-signed with the Mavericks. Powell reached the 2024 NBA Finals where the Mavericks lost to the Boston Celtics in five games.

On September 25, 2026, Powell signed a training camp contract with Dallas. On October 19, 2026, He was waived as a part of final roster cuts.

=== Fenerbahçe (2026–present) ===
On October 30, 2026, Powell signed a one-year contract with Fenerbahçe of the Turkish Basketbol Süper Ligi (BSL) and the EuroLeague.

On November 5, 2026, he made his debut and recorded 3 points, 7 rebounds, 2 assist in 13 mins 44 seconds in a 84-65 2026–27 EuroLeague home win against Baskonia.

== National team career ==
Powell with the Canadian national team in 2023

On May 24, 2022, Powell agreed to a three-year commitment to play with the Canadian senior men's national team. He was named to Canada's roster for the 2024 Summer Olympics in Paris.

== Career statistics ==
Legend
GP	Games played	GS	Games started	MPG	Minutes per game
FG%	Field goal percentage	3P%	3-point field goal percentage	FT%	Free throw percentage
RPG	Rebounds per game	APG	Assists per game	SPG	Steals per game
BPG	Blocks per game	PPG	Points per game	**Bold**	Career high
*	Led the league

=== NBA ===
==== Regular season ====
Year	Team	GP	GS	MPG	FG%	3P%	FT%	RPG	APG	SPG	BPG	PPG
2014–15	Boston	5	0	1.8	**.800**	.000	.500	.2	.0	.4	.0	1.8
2014–15	Dallas	24	0	9.5	.435	.273	.774	2.0	.4	.3	.3	3.4
2015–16	Dallas	69	2	14.4	.493	.125	.739	4.0	.6	.5	.3	5.8
2016–17	Dallas	77	3	17.3	.515	.284	.759	4.0	.6	.8	.5	6.7
2017–18	Dallas	79	24	21.2	.593	.333	.719	5.6	1.2	.8	.4	8.5
2018–19	Dallas	77	22	21.6	.597	.307	.770	5.3	**1.5**	.6	**.6**	**10.6**
2019–20	Dallas	40	37	**26.5**	.638	.256	.667	**5.7**	**1.5**	**.9**	**.6**	9.4
2020–21	Dallas	58	19	16.6	.619	.238	.782	4.0	1.1	.6	.5	5.9
2021–22	Dallas	**82***	**71**	21.9	.671	351	**.783**	4.9	1.2	.5	.5	8.7
2022–23	Dallas	76	64	19.2	.732	.000	.667	4.1	.9	.6	.3	6.7
2023–24	Dallas	63	9	13.3	.679	.333	.708	3.4	1.3	.4	.3	3.3
2024–25	Dallas	55	3	10.0	.689	**.400**	.651	2.1	1.0	.3	.4	2.1
2025–26	Dallas	63	12	14.3	.644	.286	.696	4.1	1.1	.5	.3	3.3
Career		768	266	17.5	.606	.294	.734	4.2	1.0	.6	.4	6.5

==== Playoffs ====
Year	Team	GP	GS	MPG	FG%	3P%	FT%	RPG	APG	SPG	BPG	PPG
2015	Dallas	2	0	1.3	.000	—	—	.5	.5	.0	.0	.0
2016	Dallas	4	0	**16.0**	.474	.000	.545	**4.3**	**1.0**	**.3**	.0	**6.0**
2021	Dallas	7	0	7.5	**.875**	—	**.833**	1.9	.9	**.3**	.0	2.7
2022	Dallas	**18**	**18**	13.8	.629	.000	.609	2.6	.2	.2	**.3**	3.2
2024	Dallas	13	0	3.4	.333	—	.667	.9	.2	.1	.0	.5
Career		44	18	9.4	.591	.000	.630	2.0	.4	.2	.1	2.4

=== EuroLeague ===
Year	Team	GP	GS	MPG	FG%	3P%	FT%	RPG	APG	SPG	BPG	PPG	PIR
2026–27	Fenerbahçe	**2**	0	**13.5**	**1.000**	.000	**1.000**	**4.5**	**1.5**	**.5**	**.5**	**1.5**	**6.0**

== Personal life ==
In March 2020, Powell, alongside Mark Cuban and Luka Dončić donated $500,000 to the University of Texas Southwestern Medical Center and Parkland Memorial Hospital to support childcare for healthcare workers on the frontlines of the COVID-19 response effort.
