= 2021–22 Dallas Mavericks season =

- Head coach: Jason Kidd
- General manager: Nico Harrison
- Owners: Mark Cuban
- Arena: American Airlines Center

Results
- Record: 52–30 (.634)
- Place: Division: 2nd (Southwest); Conference: 4th (Western)
- Playoff finish: Conference finals (lost to Warriors 1–4)
- Stats at Basketball Reference

Local media
- Television: Bally Sports Southwest; KEGL
- Radio: KESN

The 2021–22 Dallas Mavericks season was the 42nd season of the franchise in the National Basketball Association (NBA). For the first time since 2007–08, Rick Carlisle would not be the head coach of the Mavericks, as he announced his departure from the team on June 17, 2021. It was the first season since 2004–05 without long-time general manager Donnie Nelson, as he announced his departure from the team on June 17, 2021, a day prior to Rick Carlisle's mutual parting with the Mavs. Carlisle and Nelson were part of the Mavs' 2010–11 championship squad, with Nelson being part of the 2005–06 team that made the Finals that year. On June 28, 2021, the Mavericks hired former player and championship member Jason Kidd as their new head coach.

In the playoffs, the Mavericks defeated the Utah Jazz in six games in the first round, winning their first playoff series since their 2011 championship run. The Mavericks then upset the top-seeded Phoenix Suns in seven games in the conference semifinals, but lost to the eventual champion Golden State Warriors in five games in the conference finals.

== Draft ==
The Mavericks had no picks in this year's draft after trading their two choices away to the New York Knicks (as part of the 2019 Kristaps Porziņģis trade) and to the New Orleans Pelicans (who later sent the second-rounder to the Philadelphia 76ers), respectively.

== Roster ==
2021–22 Dallas Mavericks roster
Players

Pos.	No.	Player	Height	Weight	DOB	From
F	44	Dāvis Bertāns	6 ft 10 in (2.08 m)	225 lb (102 kg)	1992-11-12	Latvia
G/F	0	Sterling Brown	6 ft 5 in (1.96 m)	219 lb (99 kg)	1995-02-10	SMU
G	13	Jalen Brunson	6 ft 1 in (1.85 m)	190 lb (86 kg)	1996-08-31	Villanova
G/F	25	Reggie Bullock	6 ft 6 in (1.98 m)	205 lb (93 kg)	1991-03-16	North Carolina
G	3	Trey Burke	6 ft 0 in (1.83 m)	185 lb (84 kg)	1992-11-12	Michigan
F	32	Marquese Chriss	6 ft 9 in (2.06 m)	240 lb (109 kg)	1997-07-02	Washington
G	26	Spencer Dinwiddie	6 ft 5 in (1.96 m)	215 lb (98 kg)	1993-04-06	Colorado
G/F	77	Luka Dončić	6 ft 7 in (2.01 m)	230 lb (104 kg)	1999-02-28	Slovenia
F	10	Dorian Finney-Smith	6 ft 7 in (2.01 m)	220 lb (100 kg)	1993-05-04	Florida
G	8	Josh Green	6 ft 5 in (1.96 m)	200 lb (91 kg)	2000-11-16	Arizona
G/F	11	Tim Hardaway Jr.	6 ft 5 in (1.96 m)	205 lb (93 kg)	1992-03-16	Michigan
F	42	Maxi Kleber	6 ft 10 in (2.08 m)	240 lb (109 kg)	1992-01-29	Germany
C	51	Boban Marjanović	7 ft 4 in (2.24 m)	290 lb (132 kg)	1988-08-15	Serbia
G	21	Frank Ntilikina	6 ft 4 in (1.93 m)	200 lb (91 kg)	1998-07-28	France
G/F	1	Theo Pinson (TW)	6 ft 5 in (1.96 m)	212 lb (96 kg)	1995-11-05	North Carolina
F/C	7	Dwight Powell	6 ft 10 in (2.08 m)	240 lb (109 kg)	1991-07-20	Stanford
F	5	Moses Wright (TW)	6 ft 8 in (2.03 m)	226 lb (103 kg)	1998-12-23	Georgia Tech

Coaches
Head coach
- Jason Kidd
Assistant(s)
- Darrell Armstrong
- Jared Dudley
- Igor Kokoškov
- Peter Patton
- God Shammgod
- Greg St. Jean
- Sean Sweeney
- Kristi Toliver

Legend
- (DP) Unsigned draft pick
- (FA) Free agent
- (S) Suspended
- (GL) On assignment to G League affiliate
- (TW) Two-way affiliate player
- Injured

Roster
Updated: April 8, 2022

== Standings ==
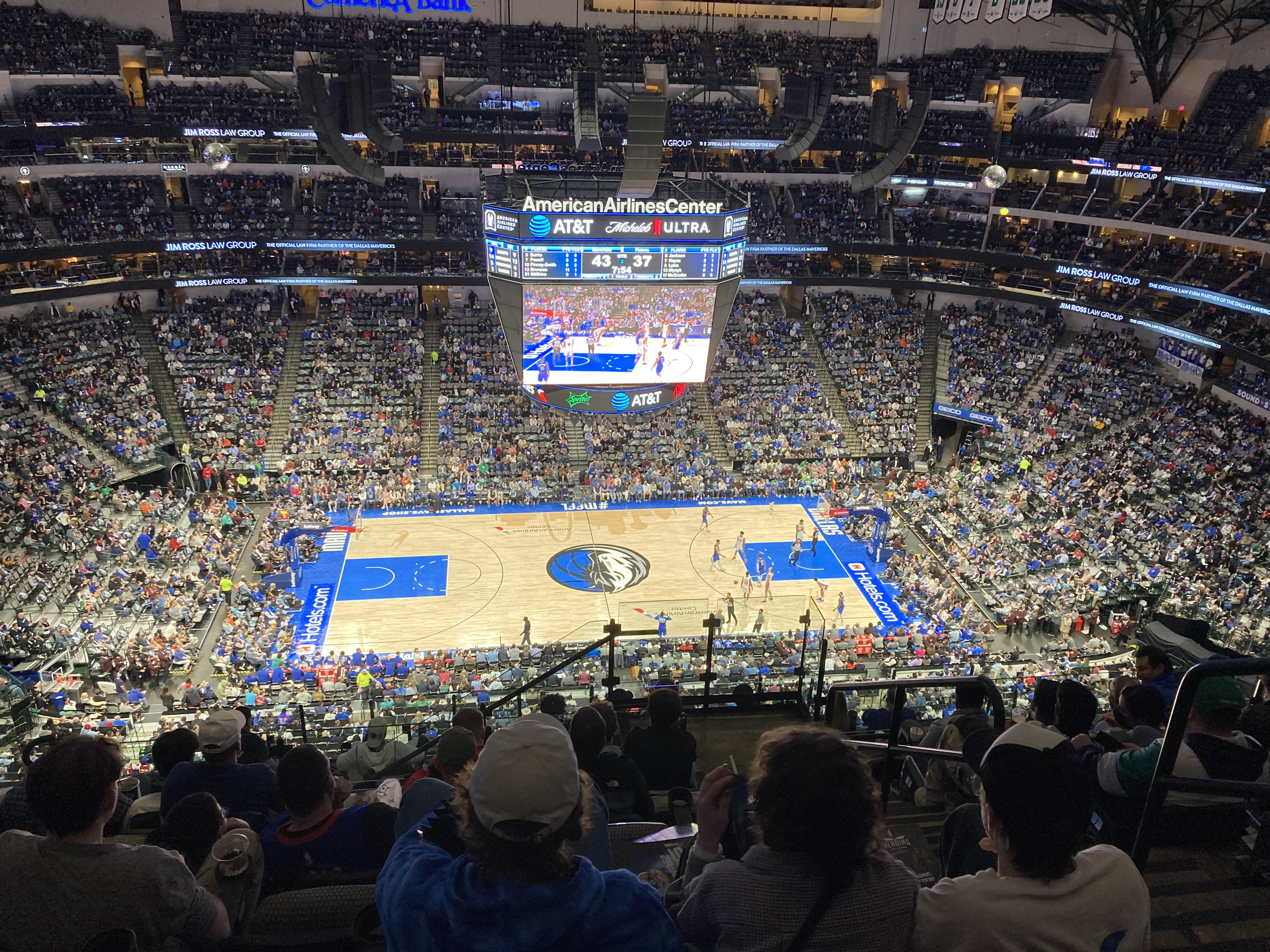
The Mavericks in action against the Detroit Pistons

=== Division ===
Southwest Division	W	L	PCT	GB	Home	Road	Div	GP
y – Memphis Grizzlies	56	26	.683	–	30‍–‍11	26‍–‍15	11–5	82
x – Dallas Mavericks	52	30	.634	4.0	29‍–‍12	23‍–‍18	14–2	82
x – New Orleans Pelicans	36	46	.439	20.0	19‍–‍22	17‍–‍24	6–10	82
pi − San Antonio Spurs	34	48	.415	22.0	16‍–‍25	18‍–‍23	6–10	82
Houston Rockets	20	62	.244	36.0	11‍–‍30	9‍–‍32	3–13	82

=== Conference ===
Western Conference
#	Team	W	L	PCT	GB	GP
1	z – Phoenix Suns *	64	18	.780	–	82
2	y – Memphis Grizzlies *	56	26	.683	8.0	82
3	x – Golden State Warriors	53	29	.646	11.0	82
4	x – Dallas Mavericks	52	30	.634	12.0	82
5	y – Utah Jazz *	49	33	.598	15.0	82
6	x – Denver Nuggets	48	34	.585	16.0	82
7	x – Minnesota Timberwolves	46	36	.561	18.0	82
8	pi – Los Angeles Clippers	42	40	.512	22.0	82
9	x – New Orleans Pelicans	36	46	.439	28.0	82
10	pi − San Antonio Spurs	34	48	.415	30.0	82
11	Los Angeles Lakers	33	49	.402	31.0	82
12	Sacramento Kings	30	52	.366	34.0	82
13	Portland Trail Blazers	27	55	.329	37.0	82
14	Oklahoma City Thunder	24	58	.293	40.0	82
15	Houston Rockets	20	62	.244	44.0	82

== Schedule ==
=== Preseason ===
The preseason schedule was announced on September 10, 2021.

2021–22 game log
Total: 4–0 (home: 2–0; road: 2–0)
Preseason: 4–0 (home: 2–0; road: 2–0)

Game	Date	Team	Score	High points	High rebounds	High assists	Location Attendance	Record
1	October 6	Utah	W 111–101	Luka Dončić (19)	Willie Cauley-Stein (9)	Jalen Brunson (8)	American Airlines Center; 15,841	1–0
2	October 8	LA Clippers	W 122–114	Eugene Omoruyi (19)	Dončić, Green (8)	Luka Dončić (9)	American Airlines Center; 17,853	2–0
3	October 13	@ Charlotte	W 127–59	Tim Hardaway Jr. (19)	Kristaps Porziņģis (9)	Luka Dončić (8)	Spectrum Center; 8,583	3–0
4	October 15	@ Milwaukee	W 114–103	Jalen Brunson (17)	Dorian Finney-Smith (7)	Jalen Brunson (5)	Fiserv Forum; 12,946	4–0

2021–22 season schedule

=== Regular season ===
The national TV games in the first week and the Christmas games were announced on August 17, 2021. The whole schedule was revealed on August 20, 2021.

2021–22 game log
Total: 52–30 (home: 29–12; road: 23–18)
October: 4–2 (home: 3–0; road: 1–2)

Game	Date	Team	Score	High points	High rebounds	High assists	Location Attendance	Record
1	October 21	@ Atlanta	L 87–113	Luka Dončić (18)	Luka Dončić (11)	Luka Dončić (7)	State Farm Arena; 17,162	0–1
2	October 23	@ Toronto	W 103–95	Luka Dončić (27)	Kristaps Porziņģis (10)	Luka Dončić (12)	Scotiabank Arena; 19,800	1–1
3	October 26	Houston	W 116–106	Luka Dončić (26)	Luka Dončić (14)	Jalen Brunson (11)	American Airlines Center; 19,337	2–1
4	October 28	San Antonio	W 104–99	Luka Dončić (25)	Maxi Kleber (10)	Brunson, Dončić (5)	American Airlines Center; 19,228	3–1
5	October 29	@ Denver	L 75–106	Luka Dončić (16)	Josh Green (7)	Luka Dončić (4)	Ball Arena; 18,315	3–2
6	October 31	Sacramento	W 105–99	Luka Dončić (23)	Dončić, Powell (8)	Luka Dončić (10)	American Airlines Center; 19,231	4–2

November: 6–7 (home: 3–3; road: 3–4)

Game	Date	Team	Score	High points	High rebounds	High assists	Location Attendance	Record
7	November 2	Miami	L 110–125	Luka Dončić (33)	Dwight Powell (8)	Luka Dončić (5)	American Airlines Center; 19,255	4–3
8	November 3	@ San Antonio	W 109–108	Jalen Brunson (31)	Luka Dončić (12)	Luka Dončić (7)	AT&T Center; 16,536	5–3
9	November 6	Boston	W 107–104	Luka Dončić (33)	Luka Dončić (9)	Brunson, Dončić (5)	American Airlines Center; 20,052	6–3
10	November 8	New Orleans	W 108–92	Luka Dončić (25)	Porziņģis, Powell (8)	Jalen Brunson (6)	American Airlines Center; 19,231	7–3
11	November 10	@ Chicago	L 107–117	Kristaps Porziņģis (22)	Kristaps Porziņģis (12)	Luka Dončić (10)	United Center; 20,910	7–4
12	November 12	@ San Antonio	W 123–109	Luka Dončić (32)	Luka Dončić (12)	Luka Dončić (15)	AT&T Center; 13,425	8–4
13	November 15	Denver	W 111–101	Kristaps Porziņģis (29)	Kristaps Porziņģis (11)	Luka Dončić (11)	American Airlines Center; 19,797	9–4
14	November 17	@ Phoenix	L 98–105	Tim Hardaway Jr. (22)	Dwight Powell (13)	Jalen Brunson (9)	Footprint Center; 14,838	9–5
15	November 19	@ Phoenix	L 104–112	Kristaps Porziņģis (23)	Kristaps Porziņģis (12)	Jalen Brunson (10)	Footprint Center; 17,071	9–6
16	November 21	@ LA Clippers	L 91–97	Kristaps Porziņģis (25)	Kristaps Porziņģis (8)	Jalen Brunson (8)	Staples Center; 17,149	9–7
17	November 23	@ LA Clippers	W 112–104 (OT)	Kristaps Porziņģis (30)	Dončić, Kleber (9)	Luka Dončić (9)	Staples Center; 17,067	10–7
18	November 27	Washington	L 114–120	Luka Dončić (33)	Kristaps Porziņģis (7)	Luka Dončić (10)	American Airlines Center; 20,223	10–8
19	November 29	Cleveland	L 96–114	Luka Dončić (25)	Luka Dončić (10)	Luka Dončić (10)	American Airlines Center; 19,229	10–9

December: 7–9 (home: 2–5; road: 5–4)

Game	Date	Team	Score	High points	High rebounds	High assists	Location Attendance	Record
20	December 1	@ New Orleans	W 139–107	Luka Dončić (28)	Kristaps Porziņģis (10)	Luka Dončić (14)	Smoothie King Center; 15,558	11–9
21	December 3	New Orleans	L 91–107	Luka Dončić (21)	Luka Dončić (10)	Luka Dončić (7)	American Airlines Center; 19,218	11–10
22	December 4	Memphis	L 90–97	Tim Hardaway Jr. (29)	Maxi Kleber (9)	Jalen Brunson (8)	American Airlines Center; 19,396	11–11
23	December 7	Brooklyn	L 99–102	Luka Dončić (28)	Kristaps Porziņģis (12)	Luka Dončić (9)	American Airlines Center; 19,559	11–12
24	December 8	@ Memphis	W 104–96	Luka Dončić (26)	Luka Dončić (8)	Brunson, Dončić (7)	FedExForum; 14,025	12–12
25	December 10	@ Indiana	L 93–106	Luka Dončić (27)	Luka Dončić (9)	Luka Dončić (9)	Bankers Life Fieldhouse; 12,618	12–13
26	December 12	@ Oklahoma City	W 103–84	Jalen Brunson (18)	Jalen Brunson (9)	Burke, Finney-Smith (9)	Paycom Center; 15,747	13–13
27	December 13	Charlotte	W 120–96	Kristaps Porziņģis (24)	Kristaps Porziņģis (13)	Jalen Brunson (8)	American Airlines Center; 19,213	14–13
28	December 15	LA Lakers	L 104–107 (OT)	Jalen Brunson (25)	Kristaps Porziņģis (12)	Jalen Brunson (9)	American Airlines Center; 20,270	14–14
29	December 19	@ Minnesota	L 105–111	Tim Hardaway Jr. (28)	Maxi Kleber (14)	Jalen Brunson (11)	Target Center; 16,127	14–15
30	December 21	Minnesota	W 114–102	Jalen Brunson (28)	Sterling Brown (11)	Trey Burke (7)	American Airlines Center; 20,056	15–15
31	December 23	Milwaukee	L 95–102	Jalen Brunson (19)	Sterling Brown (13)	Jalen Brunson (8)	American Airlines Center; 19,654	15–16
32	December 25	@ Utah	L 116–120	Brunson, Porziņģis (27)	Kristaps Porziņģis (9)	Jalen Brunson (6)	Vivint Arena; 18,306	15–17
33	December 27	@ Portland	W 132–117	Kristaps Porziņģis (34)	Finney-Smith, Porziņģis (9)	Josh Green (10)	Moda Center; 18,430	16–17
34	December 29	@ Sacramento	L 94–95	Jalen Brunson (25)	Kristaps Porziņģis (7)	Jalen Brunson (6)	Golden 1 Center; 16,071	16–18
35	December 31	@ Sacramento	W 112–96	Kristaps Porziņģis (24)	Kristaps Porziņģis (9)	Jalen Brunson (8)	Golden 1 Center; 15,833	17–18

January: 12–4 (home: 8–1; road: 4–3)

Game	Date	Team	Score	High points	High rebounds	High assists	Location Attendance	Record
36	January 2	@ Oklahoma City	W 95–86	Chriss, Hardaway Jr. (15)	Luka Dončić (9)	Luka Dončić (10)	Paycom Center; 14,751	18–18
37	January 3	Denver	W 103–89	Luka Dončić (21)	Luka Dončić (8)	Luka Dončić (15)	American Airlines Center; 19,767	19–18
38	January 5	Golden State	W 99–82	Luka Dončić (26)	Maxi Kleber (10)	Luka Dončić (8)	American Airlines Center; 20,441	20–18
39	January 7	@ Houston	W 130–106	Tim Hardaway Jr. (19)	Maxi Kleber (11)	Jalen Brunson (10)	Toyota Center; 15,238	21–18
40	January 9	Chicago	W 113–99	Luka Dončić (22)	Luka Dončić (14)	Luka Dončić (14)	American Airlines Center; 20,041	22–18
41	January 12	@ New York	L 85–108	Luka Dončić (21)	Luka Dončić (11)	Jalen Brunson (6)	Madison Square Garden; 18,215	22–19
42	January 14	@ Memphis	W 112–85	Luka Dončić (27)	Luka Dončić (12)	Luka Dončić (10)	FedExForum; 16,712	23–19
43	January 15	Orlando	W 108–92	Luka Dončić (23)	Luka Dončić (9)	three players (3)	American Airlines Center; 19,816	24–19
44	January 17	Oklahoma City	W 104–102	Luka Dončić (20)	Luka Dončić (11)	Luka Dončić (12)	American Airlines Center; 19,266	25–19
45	January 19	Toronto	W 102–98	Luka Dončić (41)	Luka Dončić (14)	Luka Dončić (7)	American Airlines Center; 19,218	26–19
46	January 20	Phoenix	L 101–109	Luka Dončić (28)	Kristaps Porziņģis (11)	Luka Dončić (8)	American Airlines Center; 19,584	26–20
47	January 23	Memphis	W 104–91	Luka Dončić (37)	Luka Dončić (11)	Luka Dončić (9)	American Airlines Center; 19,701	27–20
48	January 25	@ Golden State	L 92–130	Luka Dončić (25)	Luka Dončić (8)	Jalen Brunson (5)	Chase Center; 18,064	27–21
49	January 26	@ Portland	W 132–112	Kristaps Porziņģis (22)	Luka Dončić (10)	Luka Dončić (15)	Moda Center; 16,334	28–21
50	January 29	Indiana	W 132–105	Luka Dončić (30)	Maxi Kleber (14)	Luka Dončić (12)	American Airlines Center; 19,831	29–21
51	January 30	@ Orlando	L 108–110	Luka Dončić (34)	Luka Dončić (12)	Luka Dončić (11)	Amway Center; 13,376	29–22

February: 7–3 (home: 4–2; road: 3–1)

Game	Date	Team	Score	High points	High rebounds	High assists	Location Attendance	Record
52	February 2	Oklahoma City	L 114–120 (OT)	Luka Dončić (40)	Bullock, Kleber (8)	Luka Dončić (10)	American Airlines Center; 19,200	29–23
53	February 4	Philadelphia	W 107–98	Luka Dončić (33)	Luka Dončić (13)	Luka Dončić (15)	American Airlines Center; 19,200	30–23
54	February 6	Atlanta	W 104–93	Brunson, Bullock (22)	Luka Dončić (10)	Luka Dončić (11)	American Airlines Center; 19,887	31–23
55	February 8	Detroit	W 116–86	Luka Dončić (33)	Dončić, Finney-Smith, Kleber, Powell (7)	Luka Dončić (11)	American Airlines Center; 19,200	32–23
56	February 10	LA Clippers	W 112–105	Luka Dončić (51)	Dončić, Kleber (9)	Luka Dončić (6)	American Airlines Center; 19,532	33–23
57	February 12	LA Clippers	L 97–99	Luka Dončić (45)	Luka Dončić (15)	Luka Dončić (8)	American Airlines Center; 20,028	33–24
58	February 15	@ Miami	W 107–99	Luka Dončić (21)	Luka Dončić (10)	Brunson, Dončić (6)	FTX Arena; 19,600	34–24
59	February 17	@ New Orleans	W 125–118	Luka Dončić (49)	Luka Dončić (15)	Luka Dončić (8)	Smoothie King Center; 15,906	35–24
60	February 25	@ Utah	L 109–114	Luka Dončić (23)	Dončić, Powell (7)	Luka Dončić (11)	Vivint Arena; 18,306	35–25
61	February 27	@ Golden State	W 107–101	Luka Dončić (34)	Luka Dončić (11)	Brunson, Dinwiddie (5)	Chase Center; 18,064	36–25

March: 12–4 (home: 7–1; road: 5–3)

Game	Date	Team	Score	High points	High rebounds	High assists	Location Attendance	Record
62	March 1	@ LA Lakers	W 109–104	Luka Dončić (25)	Dorian Finney-Smith (9)	Spencer Dinwiddie (9)	Staples Center; 17,857	37–25
63	March 3	Golden State	W 122–113	Luka Dončić (41)	Luka Dončić (10)	Luka Dončić (9)	American Airlines Center; 20,229	38–25
64	March 5	Sacramento	W 114–113	Spencer Dinwiddie (36)	Josh Green (12)	Spencer Dinwiddie (7)	American Airlines Center; 20,060	39–25
65	March 7	Utah	W 111–103	Luka Dončić (35)	Luka Dončić (16)	Luka Dončić (7)	American Airlines Center; 20,077	40–25
66	March 9	New York	L 77–107	Luka Dončić (31)	Reggie Bullock (7)	Luka Dončić (4)	American Airlines Center; 20,182	40–26
67	March 11	@ Houston	W 113–100	Luka Dončić (30)	Luka Dončić (14)	Spencer Dinwiddie (7)	Toyota Center; 15,060	41–26
68	March 13	@ Boston	W 95–92	Luka Dončić (26)	Maxi Kleber (14)	Luka Dončić (8)	TD Garden; 19,156	42–26
69	March 16	@ Brooklyn	W 113–111	Luka Dončić (37)	Luka Dončić (9)	Luka Dončić (9)	Barclays Center; 17,981	43–26
70	March 18	@ Philadelphia	L 101–111	Jalen Brunson (24)	Spencer Dinwiddie (8)	Luka Dončić (10)	Wells Fargo Center; 21,428	43–27
71	March 19	@ Charlotte	L 108–129	Luka Dončić (37)	Marquese Chriss (9)	Frank Ntilikina (4)	Spectrum Center; 19,279	43–28
72	March 21	Minnesota	W 110–108	Dwight Powell (22)	Dinwiddie, Powell (8)	Luka Dončić (10)	American Airlines Center; 20,077	44–28
73	March 23	Houston	W 110–91	Jalen Brunson (28)	Maxi Kleber (9)	Spencer Dinwiddie (6)	American Airlines Center; 20,026	45–28
74	March 25	@ Minnesota	L 95–116	Luka Dončić (24)	Luka Dončić (10)	Luka Dončić (8)	Target Center; 17,136	45–29
75	March 27	Utah	W 114–100	Luka Dončić (32)	Brunson, Dončić (10)	Brunson, Dončić (5)	American Airlines Center; 20,177	46–29
76	March 29	LA Lakers	W 128–110	Luka Dončić (34)	Luka Dončić (12)	Luka Dončić (12)	American Airlines Center; 20,382	47–29
77	March 30	@ Cleveland	W 120–112	Luka Dončić (35)	Luka Dončić (9)	Luka Dončić (13)	Rocket Mortgage FieldHouse; 19,432	48–29

April: 4–1 (home: 2–0; road: 2–1)

Game	Date	Team	Score	High points	High rebounds	High assists	Location Attendance	Record
78	April 1	@ Washington	L 103–135	Luka Dončić (36)	Luka Dončić (7)	Luka Dončić (6)	Capital One Arena; 17,745	48–30
79	April 3	@ Milwaukee	W 118–112	Luka Dončić (32)	Dwight Powell (13)	Luka Dončić (15)	Fiserv Forum; 17,902	49–30
80	April 6	@ Detroit	W 131–113	Luka Dončić (26)	Luka Dončić (8)	Luka Dončić (14)	Little Caesars Arena; 18,422	50–30
81	April 8	Portland	W 128–78	Luka Dončić (39)	Luka Dončić (11)	Luka Dončić (7)	American Airlines Center; 20,174	51–30
82	April 10	San Antonio	W 130–120	Luka Dončić (26)	Luka Dončić (8)	Luka Dončić (9)	American Airlines Center; 20,270	52–30

2021–22 season schedule

=== Playoffs ===
2022 playoff game log
Total: 9–9 (home: 6–2; road: 3–7)
First Round: 4–2 (home: 2–1; road: 2–1)

Game	Date	Team	Score	High points	High rebounds	High assists	Location Attendance	Series
1	April 16	Utah	L 93–99	Jalen Brunson (24)	Jalen Brunson (7)	Spencer Dinwiddie (8)	American Airlines Center; 20,013	0–1
2	April 18	Utah	W 110–104	Jalen Brunson (41)	Jalen Brunson (8)	Spencer Dinwiddie (6)	American Airlines Center; 20,113	1–1
3	April 21	@ Utah	W 126–118	Jalen Brunson (31)	Dorian Finney-Smith (8)	Dinwiddie, Green (6)	Vivint Arena; 18,306	2–1
4	April 23	@ Utah	L 99–100	Luka Dončić (30)	Luka Dončić (10)	Luka Dončić (4)	Vivint Arena; 18,306	2–2
5	April 25	Utah	W 102–77	Luka Dončić (33)	Luka Dončić (13)	Luka Dončić (5)	American Airlines Center; 20,577	3–2
6	April 28	@ Utah	W 98–96	Brunson, Dončić (24)	Dorian Finney-Smith (10)	Luka Dončić (8)	Vivint Arena; 18,306	4–2

Conference Semifinals: 4–3 (home: 3–0; road: 1–3)

Game	Date	Team	Score	High points	High rebounds	High assists	Location Attendance	Series
1	May 2	@ Phoenix	L 114–121	Luka Dončić (45)	Luka Dončić (12)	Luka Dončić (8)	Footprint Center; 17,071	0–1
2	May 4	@ Phoenix	L 109–129	Luka Dončić (35)	Brunson, Dončić (5)	Luka Dončić (7)	Footprint Center; 17,071	0–2
3	May 6	Phoenix	W 103–94	Jalen Brunson (28)	Luka Dončić (13)	Luka Dončić (9)	American Airlines Center; 20,777	1–2
4	May 8	Phoenix	W 111–101	Luka Dončić (26)	Dorian Finney-Smith (8)	Luka Dončić (11)	American Airlines Center; 20,610	2–2
5	May 10	@ Phoenix	L 80–110	Luka Dončić (28)	Luka Dončić (11)	three players (2)	Footprint Center; 17,071	2–3
6	May 12	Phoenix	W 113–86	Luka Dončić (33)	Luka Dončić (11)	Luka Dončić (8)	American Airlines Center; 20,777	3–3
7	May 15	@ Phoenix	W 123–90	Luka Dončić (35)	Luka Dončić (10)	Dončić, Finney-Smith (4)	Footprint Center; 17,071	4–3

Conference Finals: 1–4 (home: 1–1; road: 0–3)

Game	Date	Team	Score	High points	High rebounds	High assists	Location Attendance	Series
1	May 18	@ Golden State	L 87–112	Luka Dončić (20)	Dončić, Finney-Smith (7)	Brunson, Dončić (4)	Chase Center; 18,064	0–1
2	May 20	@ Golden State	L 117–126	Luka Dončić (42)	Dorian Finney-Smith (8)	Luka Dončić (8)	Chase Center; 18,064	0–2
3	May 22	Golden State	L 100–109	Luka Dončić (40)	Luka Dončić (11)	Reggie Bullock (4)	American Airlines Center; 20,813	0–3
4	May 24	Golden State	W 119–109	Luka Dončić (30)	Luka Dončić (14)	Luka Dončić (9)	American Airlines Center; 20,810	1–3
5	May 26	@ Golden State	L 110–120	Luka Dončić (28)	Luka Dončić (9)	Luka Dončić (6)	Chase Center; 18,064	1–4

2022 playoff schedule

== Player statistics ==
=== Regular season ===
Player	POS	GP	GS	MP	REB	AST	STL	BLK	PTS	MPG	RPG	APG	SPG	BPG	PPG
Dwight Powell	C	82	71	1,798	404	97	37	39	717	21.9	4.9	1.2	.5	.5	8.7
Dorian Finney-Smith	PF	80	80	2,644	375	150	88	39	880	33.1	4.7	1.9	1.1	.5	11.0
Jalen Brunson	SG	79	61	2,524	309	377	66	3	1,285	31.9	3.9	4.8	.8	.0	16.3
Reggie Bullock	SF	68	37	1,902	241	83	41	14	583	28.0	3.5	1.2	.6	.2	8.6
Josh Green	SG	67	3	1,039	161	79	45	14	319	15.5	2.4	1.2	.7	.2	4.8
Luka Dončić	PG	65	65	2,301	593	568	75	36	1,847	35.4	9.1	8.7	1.2	.6	28.4
Maxi Kleber	PF	59	21	1,450	350	68	30	58	411	24.6	5.9	1.2	.5	1.0	7.0
Frank Ntilikina^{†}	SG	58	5	685	79	69	27	7	240	11.8	1.4	1.2	.5	.1	4.1
Sterling Brown	SG	49	3	628	149	34	14	7	160	12.8	3.0	.7	.3	.1	3.3
Tim Hardaway Jr.	SG	42	20	1,245	156	92	38	6	598	29.6	3.7	2.2	.9	.1	14.2
Trey Burke	PG	42	0	441	33	57	12	0	214	10.5	.8	1.4	.3	.0	5.1
Kristaps Porziņģis^{†}	PF	34	34	1,002	261	69	25	59	654	29.5	7.7	2.0	.7	1.7	19.2
Marquese Chriss	PF	34	0	346	103	17	13	12	154	10.2	3.0	.5	.4	.4	4.5
Moses Brown^{†}	C	26	1	169	61	1	3	9	81	6.5	2.3	.0	.1	.3	3.1
Spencer Dinwiddie^{†}	PG	23	7	650	72	90	17	6	363	28.3	3.1	3.9	.7	.3	15.8
Boban Marjanović	C	23	0	128	39	3	0	3	98	5.6	1.7	.1	.0	.1	4.3
Dāvis Bertāns^{†}	PF	22	0	306	56	15	6	6	117	13.9	2.5	.7	.3	.3	5.3
Theo Pinson	SF	19	0	148	21	17	5	2	48	7.8	1.1	.9	.3	.1	2.5
Willie Cauley-Stein^{†}	C	18	2	177	38	9	6	3	34	9.8	2.1	.5	.3	.2	1.9
Brandon Knight	PG	5	0	65	8	8	1	0	32	13.0	1.6	1.6	.2	.0	6.4
George King	SF	4	0	19	5	0	0	0	1	4.8	1.3	.0	.0	.0	.3
Eugene Omoruyi	SF	4	0	18	7	2	0	0	7	4.5	1.8	.5	.0	.0	1.8
JaQuori McLaughlin	PG	4	0	11	0	2	0	0	0	2.8	.0	.5	.0	.0	.0
Carlik Jones^{†}	PG	3	0	19	3	5	1	0	2	6.3	1.0	1.7	.3	.0	.7
Charlie Brown Jr.^{†}	SG	3	0	15	1	1	2	1	2	5.0	.3	.3	.7	.3	.7
Moses Wright^{†}	PF	3	0	13	3	1	0	1	5	4.3	1.0	.3	.0	.3	1.7
Isaiah Thomas^{†}	PG	1	0	13	0	4	0	0	6	13.0	.0	4.0	.0	.0	6.0

- ^{†} Denotes player spent time with another team in the season. Stats reflect time with the Mavericks only.

=== Playoffs ===
Player	POS	GP	GS	MP	REB	AST	STL	BLK	PTS	MPG	RPG	APG	SPG	BPG	PPG
Reggie Bullock	SF	18	18	707	82	30	22	1	190	39.3	4.6	1.7	1.2	.1	10.6
Dorian Finney-Smith	PF	18	18	688	99	35	17	7	211	38.2	5.5	1.9	.9	.4	11.7
Jalen Brunson	SG	18	18	629	83	66	14	1	388	34.9	4.6	3.7	.8	.1	21.6
Dwight Powell	C	18	18	249	47	4	3	6	58	13.8	2.6	.2	.2	.3	3.2
Spencer Dinwiddie	PG	18	3	501	44	65	15	6	255	27.8	2.4	3.6	.8	.3	14.2
Maxi Kleber	PF	18	0	457	82	20	4	15	157	25.4	4.6	1.1	.2	.8	8.7
Dāvis Bertāns	PF	18	0	192	26	6	8	2	73	10.7	1.4	.3	.4	.1	4.1
Josh Green	SG	16	0	121	12	7	5	0	23	7.6	.8	.4	.3	.0	1.4
Luka Dončić	PG	15	15	552	147	96	27	9	475	36.8	9.8	6.4	1.8	.6	31.7
Frank Ntilikina	SG	12	0	125	12	9	8	1	23	10.4	1.0	.8	.7	.1	1.9
Trey Burke	PG	10	0	37	3	4	1	0	32	3.7	.3	.4	.1	.0	3.2
Sterling Brown	SG	9	0	26	8	3	4	2	11	2.9	.9	.3	.4	.2	1.2
Marquese Chriss	PF	8	0	30	9	0	0	0	14	3.8	1.1	.0	.0	.0	1.8
Boban Marjanović	C	3	0	6	3	0	1	0	4	2.0	1.0	.0	.3	.0	1.3

== Transactions ==
=== Trades ===
July 31, 2021	To Dallas Mavericks Moses Brown	To Boston Celtics Josh Richardson
February 10, 2022	To Dallas Mavericks Dāvis Bertāns; Spencer Dinwiddie	To Washington Wizards Kristaps Porziņģis; 2022 2nd-round pick

=== Contract extensions ===
Player	Signed
Luka Dončić	August 10, 2021
Dorian Finney-Smith	February 10, 2022

=== Free agents ===
==== Re-signed ====
Player	Date
Willie Cauley-Stein	August 1, 2021
Nate Hinton	August 3, 2021
Tim Hardaway Jr.	August 9, 2021
Boban Marjanović	August 10, 2021
Dorian Finney-Smith	February 12, 2022

==== Additions ====
Player	Date	Former team
Reggie Bullock	August 6	New York Knicks
Sterling Brown	August 10	Houston Rockets
Eugene Omoruyi	August 13	Oregon Ducks
Feron Hunt	August 22	SMU Mustangs
Carlik Jones	August 22	Louisville Cardinals
EJ Onu	August 22	Shawnee State Bears
JaQuori McLaughlin	September 4	UC Santa Barbara Gauchos
Frank Ntilikina	September 16	New York Knicks
Justin Jackson	October 15	Milwaukee Bucks
EJ Onu	October 15	Dallas Mavericks
Theo Pinson	January 10	Dallas Mavericks
Marquese Chriss	January 15	Dallas Mavericks
10-day contracts
Theo Pinson	December 20; December 31	Maine Celtics
Marquese Chriss	December 21; December 31; January 10	Golden State Warriors
George King	December 22	Agua Caliente Clippers
Charlie Brown	December 23	Delaware Blue Coats
Brandon Knight	December 23	Sioux Falls Skyforce
Carlik Jones	December 23	Texas Legends
Isaiah Thomas	December 29	Los Angeles Lakers

==== Subtractions ====
Player	Date	New team
Nicolò Melli	July 9	(Italy) Olimpia Milano
Tyler Bey	August 25	Houston Rockets
Nate Hinton	August 27	Indiana Pacers
EJ Onu	September 4	Dallas Mavericks
JJ Redick	September 21	Retired
Feron Hunt	October 15	Texas Legends
Carlik Jones	October 15	Texas Legends
Justin Jackson	October 15	Texas Legends
EJ Onu	October 15	Texas Legends
Eugene Omoruyi	December 26	
JaQuori McLaughlin	January 10	Santa Cruz Warriors
Willie Cauley-Stein	January 15	Philadelphia 76ers
Moses Brown	February 10	Cleveland Cavaliers

== Awards ==
Player	Award	Date awarded
Luka Dončić	All-Star	February 3, 2022
Luka Dončić	Western Conference Player of the Week	February 7–13
Luka Dončić	Western Conference Player of the Week	April 4–10
Luka Dončić	Western Conference Player of the Month	February
Luka Dončić	All-NBA First Team	June 15, 2021
Jason Kidd	Western Conference Coach of the Month	March/April
