= Josh Green (basketball) =

American-Australian basketball player (born 2000)

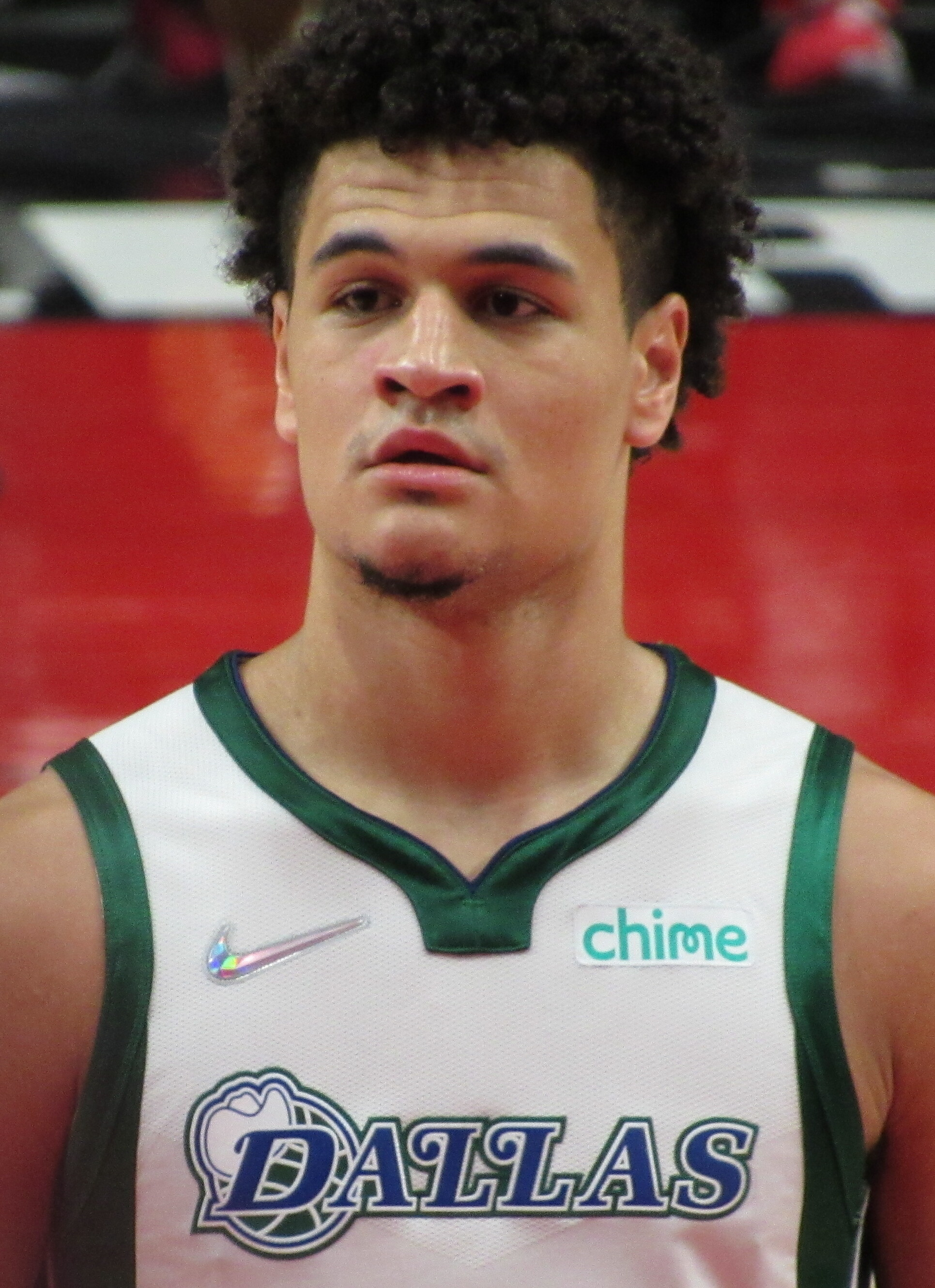
- Green with the Dallas Mavericks in 2021

No. 5 – Utah Jazz
- Position: Shooting guard
- League: NBA

Personal information
- Born: 16 November 2000 (age 26) Sydney, New South Wales, Australia
- Listed height: 6 ft 6 in (1.98 m)
- Listed weight: 200 lb (91 kg)

Career information
- High school: The King's School (Sydney, New South Wales); Mountain Ridge (Glendale, Arizona); Hillcrest Prep (Phoenix, Arizona); IMG Academy (Bradenton, Florida)
- College: Arizona (2019–2020)
- NBA draft: 2020: 1st round, 18th overall pick
- Drafted by: Dallas Mavericks
- Playing career: 2020–present

Career history
- 2020–2024: Dallas Mavericks
- 2021: →Salt Lake City Stars
- 2021: →Texas Legends
- 2024–2026: Charlotte Hornets
- 2026–present: Utah Jazz

Career highlights
- McDonald's All-American (2019)
- Stats at NBA.com
- Stats at Basketball Reference
Medals
Men's basketball
Representing Australia
Olympic Games
Bronze medal – third place	2020 Tokyo	Team

Joshua Benjamin Green (born 16 November 2000) is an Australian professional basketball player for the Utah Jazz of the National Basketball Association (NBA). He played college basketball for the Arizona Wildcats.

Green was part of the Australian basketball team that won bronze at the 2020 Tokyo Olympics. He was also part of the Australian basketball team at the 2024 Paris Olympics.

== Early life ==
Green was born in Sydney to Australian mother Cahla and American-born father Delmas. His parents met while both were playing semi-professional basketball in Australia. The couple decided to raise a family in the north-west Sydney suburb of Castle Hill where Josh began playing basketball at the age of five when his mother started coaching him. Along with playing local basketball for the Hills Hornets as a child, Green tried an array of sports as a junior and excelled in Australian rules football, athletics, basketball, rugby, soccer and swimming. Green currently holds the world record for 7 year olds in the 500m with a time of 1:29:50. By the age of 10, he had been selected to represent his home state of New South Wales in nine separate sports. In fifth grade, Green traveled more than 12 hours by car to the outback town of Broken Hill in an attempt to gain selection for the under-12 state basketball team and was told he was good enough to be on the team but would have to wait a year or two so the older boys could play. Twelve months later, he captained the under-12 NSW Metro state team to a national title. Green switched to play club basketball for Penrith in 2013 and the decision paid off when he was selected to represent the under-14 and under-16 New South Wales state teams in successive years as a bottom-ager.

Green was also a prodigious Australian rules footballer in his younger years while playing locally for the Westbrook Bulldogs and would regularly attend Sydney Swans home games with his father. Green claims to have "loved" playing Australian rules football and has "always been a big Swans fan", naming Adam Goodes and Lance Franklin as his favourite players growing up. Such was his talent in Australian rules football, the Swans and fellow professional football club Greater Western Sydney Giants offered him a place in their junior developmental academies. At the age of 13, Green accepted an offer to join the Giants' academy. However, he was forced to quit Australian rules football after the family relocated to Phoenix, Arizona, in November 2014.

== High school career ==
While in Sydney, Green attended The King's School in Parramatta and dominated the local basketball scene so much that he was selected to represent the New South Wales' under 16 state team at the age of 13. Later that year, the Green family relocated to Phoenix, Arizona, and in 2015, Josh enrolled at Mountain Ridge High School, where he impressed. In 2017, he transferred to the IMG Academy in Florida and became a five-star draft prospect. In the final game of his high school career, Green led IMG to a national championship victory with a 65–55 win over La Lumiere and was subsequently named MVP of the championship game.

He was selected for the 2019 McDonald's All-American Boys Game, along with fellow UA recruit Nico Mannion.

=== Recruiting ===
Green received an offer to join the Villanova Wildcats in April 2018. In July 2018, he received an offer to join the North Carolina Tar Heels.

Green was considered a top player in the 2019 recruiting class by 247Sports, Rivals and ESPN. On 4 October 2018, Green committed to play for the Arizona Wildcats over Kansas, North Carolina, Villanova, USC and UNLV. Green was a consensus five-star prospect out of IMG Academy in Bradenton, Florida. In October 2018, Green signed his NLI to the University of Arizona for basketball.

College recruiting
Name	Hometown	School	Height	Weight	Commit date
Josh Green; SG	Sydney, New South Wales	IMG Academy (FL)	6 ft 6 in (1.98 m)	206 lb (93 kg)	Oct 4, 2018
Josh Green; SG	Recruit ratings: Rivals: 247Sports: ESPN: (96)				
Overall recruit ranking: Rivals: 13 247Sports: 17 ESPN: 8
Note: In many cases, Scout, Rivals, 247Sports, On3, and ESPN may conflict in their listings of height and weight.; In these cases, the average was taken. ESPN grades are on a 100-point scale.; Sources: "Arizona 2019 Basketball Commitments". Rivals.; "2019 Arizona Wildcats Recruiting Class". ESPN.; "2019 Team Ranking". Rivals.

== College career ==
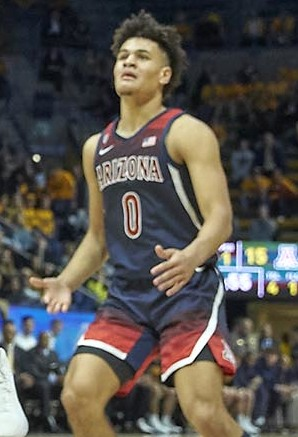
Green with Arizona in 2020

In his second college game, Green scored 20 points as Arizona beat Illinois 90–69. Green missed a game against UCLA on 29 February due to a lower back sprain. Green averaged 12.0 points, 4.6 rebounds, 2.6 assists and 1.5 steals per game for the Wildcats as a freshman while shooting 36.1% from three-point range. Following the season, he declared for the 2020 NBA draft.

== Professional career ==
=== Dallas Mavericks (2020–2024) ===
Green with the Dallas Mavericks in 2021

Green was selected with the 18th pick in the 2020 NBA draft by the Dallas Mavericks. He signed his rookie scale contract with the Mavericks on 30 November 2020. Green made his NBA debut on 23 December, scoring two points in a 106–102 loss to the Phoenix Suns. On 18 February 2021, Green received his first NBA G League assignment, to the Salt Lake City Stars. The Mavericks qualified for the postseason, but were eliminated in the first round by the Los Angeles Clippers. Green played four total minutes during the seven-game series.

On 19 October 2021, Mavericks picked up Green's option for another year until the 2022–23 season. On 27 December, after a stint in health and safety protocols, Green had a career-high 10 assists in a 132–117 win against the Portland Trail Blazers. On 7 January 2022, Green scored a season-high 17 points in a 130–106 win over the Houston Rockets. Two days later, he surpassed his season high by scoring 18 points in a 113–99 win over the Chicago Bulls. On 21 April 2022, during the Mavericks' first round playoff series against the Utah Jazz, Green recorded 12 points, three rebounds, six assists and two steals in a 126–118 game 3 win. The Mavericks won their first playoff series and reached the Western Conference Finals, both for the first time since 2011. However, they fell to the eventual champions, the Golden State Warriors, in five games.

On 20 November 2022, Green scored 23 points, alongside two rebounds, in a 98–97 loss to the Denver Nuggets. On 9 December, during a 106–105 loss to the Milwaukee Bucks, he suffered an elbow injury. He missed twenty straight games before returning to the lineup on 18 January 2023, scoring nine points in a 130–122 loss to the Atlanta Hawks. On 6 February 2023, Green scored a career-high 29 points in a 124–111 win over the Utah Jazz.

On 23 October 2023, Green signed a three-year, $41 million extension with the Mavericks. Green helped the Mavericks reach the 2024 NBA Finals where they lost to the Boston Celtics in five games.

=== Charlotte Hornets (2024–2026) ===
On 6 July 2024, Green was traded by the Mavericks to the Charlotte Hornets in a six-team sign and trade which also included the Philadelphia 76ers, Golden State Warriors, Denver Nuggets and Minnesota Timberwolves, which became the NBA's first six-team transaction. He made 68 appearances (67 starts) for Charlotte during the 2024–25 NBA season, averaging 7.4 points, 2.5 rebounds, and 1.6 assists.

On 20 June 2025, Green underwent surgery to address instability in his left shoulder. Green made his season debut on 12 December, during a 126–129 loss to the Chicago Bulls. Green made 58 appearances as a reserve for Charlotte during the 2025–26 NBA season, averaging 4.3 points, 1.8 rebounds, and 0.8 assists.

=== Utah Jazz (2026–present) ===
On 10 July 2026, Green, alongside LaMelo Ball, was traded to the Minnesota Timberwolves in a four-team trade. However on 29 August, Green was traded again, this time to the Utah Jazz alongside cash considerations in exchange for John Konchar and Cody Williams.

== National team career ==
Green was named in the 24-man squad selected to represent the Australian national team in FIBA World Cup Qualifiers against Qatar and Kazakhstan in September 2018. However, a torn labrum in his right shoulder prevented him from making his international debut. In January 2019, Green revealed his ambitions to represent Australia at the 2020 Tokyo Olympics. On 6 February 2019, Green was named in the 23-man squad selected to represent Australia's Under-19 national team at the 2019 FIBA Under-19 Basketball World Cup. In March 2019, Green signalled his aspiration to represent Australia at the 2019 FIBA World Cup. Green made his senior debut for Australia in the first round of the 2020 Olympics against Nigeria and helped his country obtain their first-ever Olympic medal in men's basketball, beating Slovenia in the bronze medal game.

== Career statistics ==
Legend
GP	Games played	GS	Games started	MPG	Minutes per game
FG%	Field goal percentage	3P%	3-point field goal percentage	FT%	Free throw percentage
RPG	Rebounds per game	APG	Assists per game	SPG	Steals per game
BPG	Blocks per game	PPG	Points per game	**Bold**	Career high
*	Led the league

=== NBA ===
==== Regular season ====
Year	Team	GP	GS	MPG	FG%	3P%	FT%	RPG	APG	SPG	BPG	PPG
2020–21	Dallas	39	5	11.4	.452	.160	.565	2.0	.7	.4	.1	2.6
2021–22	Dallas	67	3	15.5	.508	.359	.689	2.4	1.2	.7	**.2**	4.8
2022–23	Dallas	60	21	25.7	**.537**	.402	.723	3.0	1.7	.7	.1	**9.1**
2023–24	Dallas	57	33	26.4	.479	.385	.684	**3.2**	**2.3**	.8	**.2**	8.2
2024–25	Charlotte	**68**	**67**	**27.8**	.428	.391	.681	2.5	1.6	**1.1**	**.2**	7.4
2025–26	Charlotte	58	0	15.7	.459	**.420**	**.893**	1.8	.8	.6	.1	4.3
Career		349	129	21.0	.480	.387	.705	2.5	1.4	.7	.1	6.3

==== Playoffs ====
Year	Team	GP	GS	MPG	FG%	3P%	FT%	RPG	APG	SPG	BPG	PPG
2021	Dallas	1	0	4.2	—	—	—	.0	.0	.0	.0	.0
2022	Dallas	16	0	7.6	.286	.227	.250	.8	.4	.3	.0	1.4
2024	Dallas	**22***	0	**18.1**	**.424**	**.390**	**.737**	**2.5**	**1.0**	**.8**	**.1**	**5.0**
Career		39	0	13.4	.389	.346	.593	1.7	.8	.6	.1	3.4

=== College ===
Year	Team	GP	GS	MPG	FG%	3P%	FT%	RPG	APG	SPG	BPG	PPG
2019–20	Arizona	30	30	30.9	.424	.361	.780	4.6	2.6	1.5	.4	12.0

== Personal life ==
Josh Green is the son of Cahla and Delmas Green. His father played at Oregon Tech, while both of his parents played professionally in Australia. He has two brothers, Jay, who played for the Northern Arizona Lumberjacks, and Ky, and a younger sister named Maya.
