= Marquese Chriss =

American basketball player (born 1997)

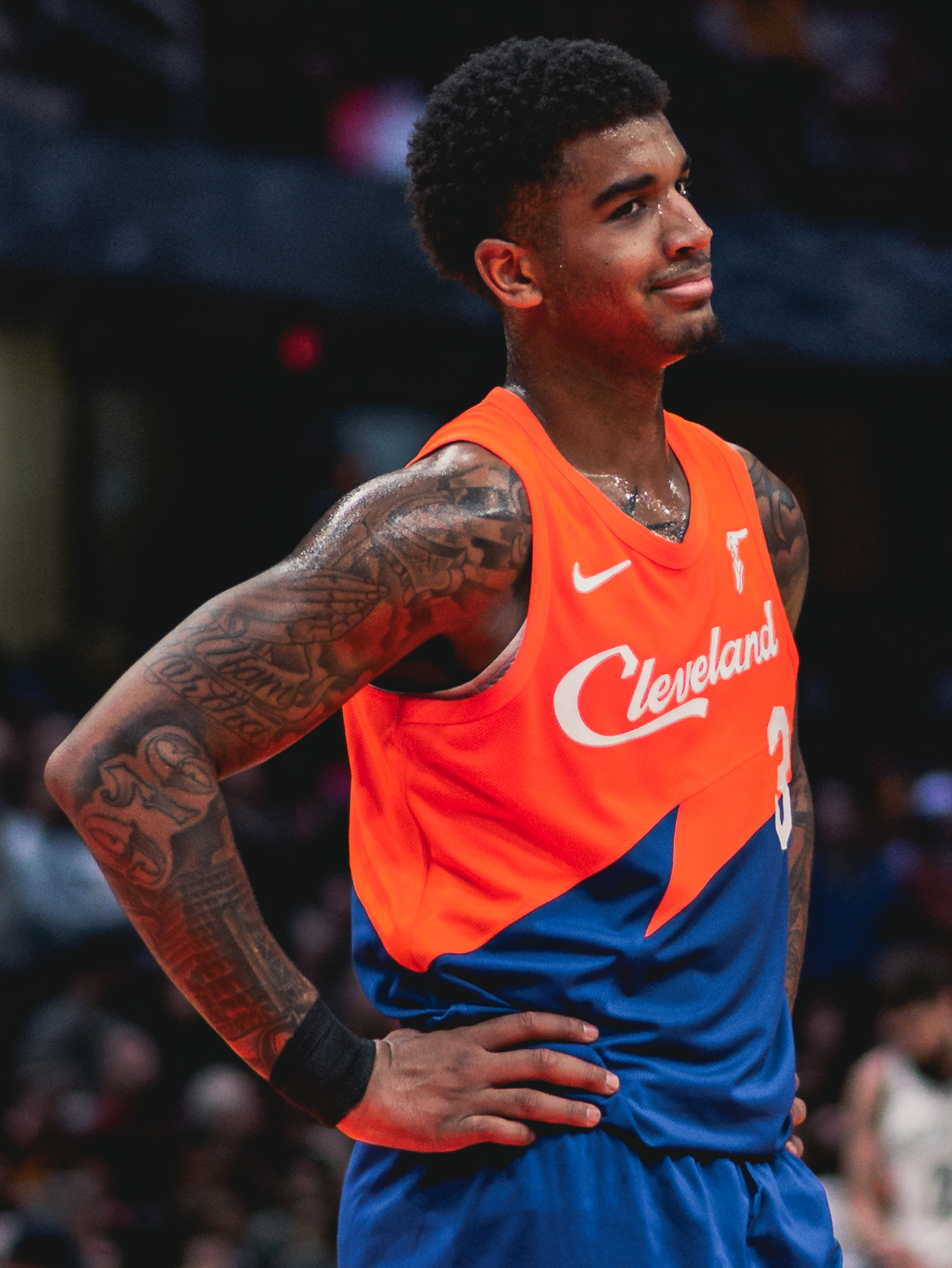
- Chriss with the Cleveland Cavaliers in 2019

No. 32 – Liaoning Flying Leopards
- Position: Power forward / center
- League: CBA

Personal information
- Born: July 2, 1997 (age 29) Sacramento, California, U.S.
- Listed height: 6 ft 9 in (2.06 m)
- Listed weight: 240 lb (109 kg)

Career information
- High school: Pleasant Grove (Elk Grove, California)
- College: Washington (2015–2016)
- NBA draft: 2016: 1st round, 8th overall pick
- Drafted by: Sacramento Kings
- Playing career: 2016–present

Career history
- 2016–2018: Phoenix Suns
- 2018–2019: Houston Rockets
- 2019: Cleveland Cavaliers
- 2019–2021: Golden State Warriors
- 2021–2022: Dallas Mavericks
- 2024: Wisconsin Herd
- 2024–2026: Shandong Hi-Speed Kirin
- 2026–present: Liaoning Flying Leopards

Career highlights
- NBA All-Rookie Second Team (2017)
- Stats at NBA.com
- Stats at Basketball Reference

Marquese De'Shawn Chriss (born July 2, 1997) is an American professional basketball player for the Liaoning Flying Leopards of the Chinese Basketball Association (CBA). He played college basketball for the Washington Huskies and was selected in the first round of the 2016 NBA draft with the eighth overall pick by the Sacramento Kings. He eventually was named to the NBA All-Rookie Second Team as a member of the Phoenix Suns.

== Early life ==
As a youth growing up in Sacramento, California, Chriss played baseball and American football. Between fifth grade and eighth grade, he showed promise as a tight end, defensive end and safety. However, during a game in his eighth-grade season, Chriss landed awkwardly on his shoulder while attempting to catch a long pass and broke his collarbone. His mother subsequently disallowed Chriss to play football from then on, and he was forced to choose basketball instead.

Chriss attended Pleasant Grove High School in Elk Grove, California. As a freshman at Pleasant Grove, Chriss was one of 25 students who showed up for tryouts. The school fielded only junior varsity and varsity teams, limiting available roster positions, particularly for players without prior competitive experience. Chriss was ultimately selected for the team, with coaches noting his level of effort during evaluations. He began the season as a reserve before eventually working his way into the starting lineup. A year later, he started for the varsity team and led the school to a 28–6 record and a state championship. Colleges began offering Chriss scholarships that season, with the first coming from Northern Arizona University. In January 2014, he committed to the University of Washington.

As a senior in 2014–15, Chriss averaged 21.9 points, 11.6 rebounds and 3.1 blocks per game. Scout ranked him as the No. 55 recruit in the nation for the class of 2015 and Rivals ranked him as the No. 56 recruit, while ESPN and 247Sports.com both ranked him at No. 60.

College recruiting
Name	Hometown	School	Height	Weight	Commit date
Marquese Chriss #13 PF	Elk Grove, CA	Pleasant Grove High School	6 ft 8 in (2.03 m)	200 lb (91 kg)	Jan 13, 2014
Marquese Chriss #13 PF	Recruit ratings: Scout: Rivals: 247Sports: ESPN:				
Overall recruit ranking: Scout: 55 Rivals: 56 ESPN: 60
Note: In many cases, Scout, Rivals, 247Sports, On3, and ESPN may conflict in their listings of height and weight.; In these cases, the average was taken. ESPN grades are on a 100-point scale.; Sources:

== College career ==
Chriss had a phenomenal start at Washington, recording a double-double with a season-high 29 points and 10 rebounds in the second game of the season against Mount St. Mary's. In the following weeks, however, his production dipped because he developed a habit of collecting unnecessary fouls. He fouled out of three straight non-conference games during the Battle 4 Atlantis in November 2015. His mother stepped in once again with a decision that likely saved his season in terms of productivity. She suggested Chriss consult a sports psychologist, and the Huskies accommodated her request. Chriss was forced to learn to play defense without fouling. He went on to have one of the top freshman campaigns in their program's history, finishing with the fourth-most points by a freshman (467), fifth-most rebounds (183), and the most blocks (55). His three-point shooting improved greatly as the season went on – he shot 6-for-26 (23.1 percent) from beyond the arc during the first 19 games of the season, and went 15-for-34 (44.1 percent) during the last 15 contests. He started all 34 games in 2015–16 and averaged 13.7 points, 5.4 rebounds and 1.6 blocks per game. He subsequently earned honorable mention Pac-12 All-Freshmen selection.

On March 23, 2016, Chriss declared for the 2016 NBA draft, forgoing his final three years of college eligibility.

== Professional career ==
=== Phoenix Suns (2016–2018) ===
==== 2016–17 season ====
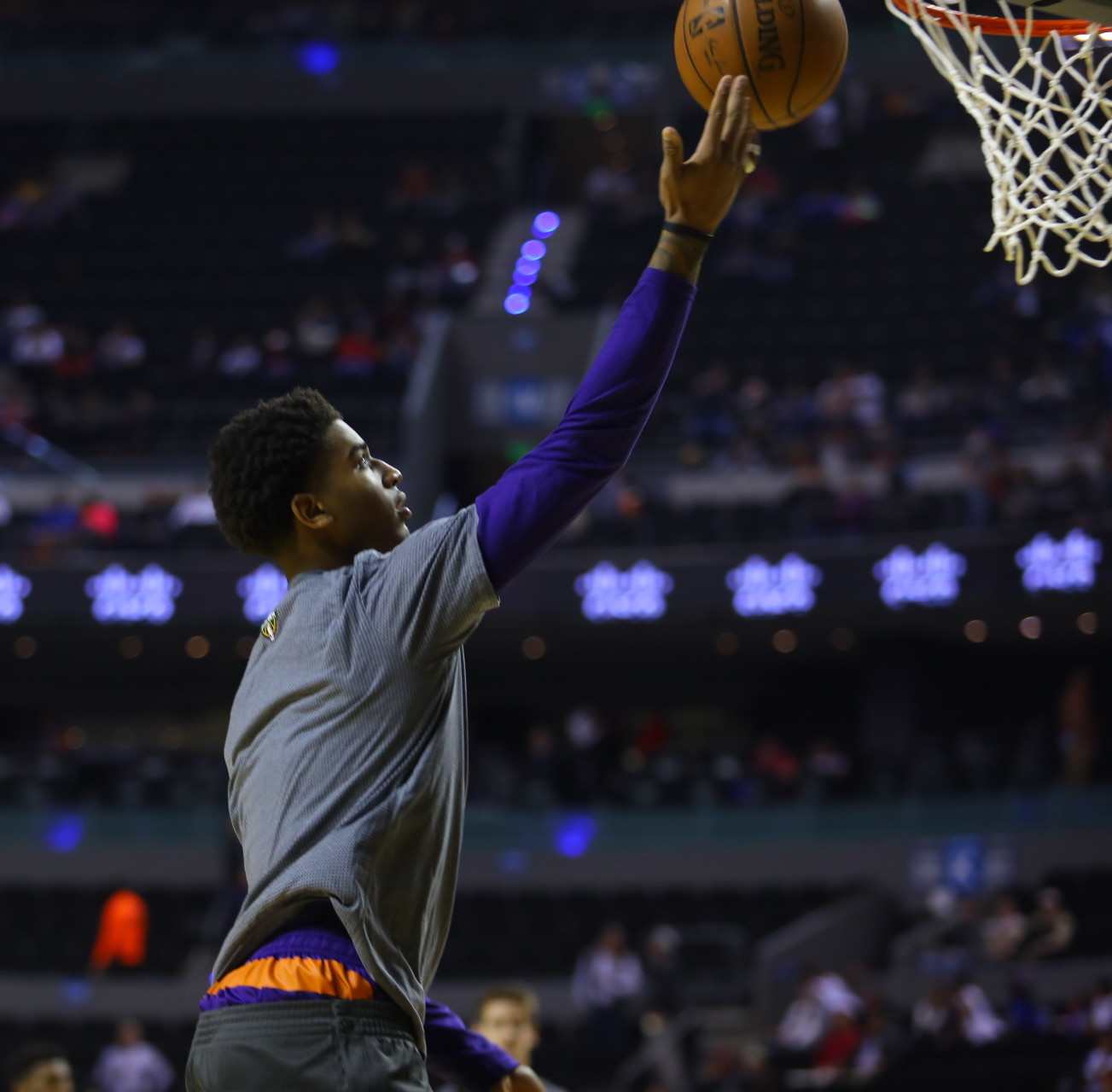
Chriss with the Phoenix Suns in 2017

Throughout the draft process, Chriss went from being a considerable late-lottery or mid-first round talent to rising up in the draft as a potential top 3 draft candidate. In the days leading up to the draft, Chriss agreed to terms on a multi-year footwear and apparel endorsement deal with Nike. He ended up being selected with the eighth overall pick in the draft by the Sacramento Kings. Chriss was later traded to the Phoenix Suns on draft night for the draft rights to Bogdan Bogdanović and the rights of the 13th and 28th picks of the draft, Georgios Papagiannis and Skal Labissière. He became the first recruit outside of the top 50 rankings to be drafted in the top 10 as a one-and-done player since the rule was instituted in 2005. On July 7, he signed his rookie scale contract with the Suns and joined the team for the 2016 NBA Summer League. Chriss played in three games for the Suns during the Summer League before developing an illness that ruled him out for the rest of the tournament.

Chriss made his debut for the Suns in their season opener on October 26, 2016, against the team that originally drafted him, the Sacramento Kings. In 22 minutes off the bench, he recorded seven points, four rebounds, two assists, and one block in a 113–94 loss. With Chriss playing alongside Devin Booker and fellow rookie Dragan Bender, the Suns became the first NBA team to have three teenagers on the floor in the same game. He made his first start for the Suns on November 8 against the Portland Trail Blazers, recording seven points, four rebounds, and one block in 20 minutes of play during the 124–121 loss. On December 13, he recorded his first career double-double with 14 points and 12 rebounds in a 113–111 overtime win over the New York Knicks. On January 25, 2017, he was named in the U.S. Team for the 2017 Rising Stars Challenge. Five days later, Chriss had his first 20-point game in a 115–96 loss to the Memphis Grizzlies. On February 2, he was named Western Conference Rookie of the Month for games played in January, after averaging 8.3 points, 3.6 rebounds, and 1.4 steals for the month. Two days later, he scored a career-high 27 points in a 137–112 loss to the Milwaukee Bucks. On March 5, he had a career-best five blocked shots in a 109–106 win over the Boston Celtics. His five blocks were the most by a Suns rookie since Amar'e Stoudemire had six in November 2002. On March 15, he tied his career high of five blocks in a 107–101 loss to the Sacramento Kings. On April 1, he recorded 19 points and a career-high 13 rebounds in a 130–117 loss to Portland. As a rookie, Chriss played in all 82 games—the only Suns player to do so in 2016–17. At the season's end, he was named to the NBA All-Rookie Second Team, becoming the 14th player in franchise history to be named All-Rookie.

==== 2017–18 season ====
In July 2017, Chriss re-joined the Suns for the 2017 NBA Summer League. In five games, Chriss averaged 14.4 points, 6.0 rebounds, 1.0 assists and 1.0 blocks per game. On December 26, 2017, Chriss tied a career high with 13 rebounds in a 99–97 win over the Memphis Grizzlies. On January 12, 2018, Chriss missed the Suns' game against the Houston Rockets due to a hip injury, ending a streak of 124 consecutive games to begin his career. It was the longest streak by a Sun since Kyle Macy played in the first 329 games of his pro career from 1980 to 1984. He returned to action on January 26 after missing six games, and was 1-for-12 from the field for three points in a 107–85 loss to the New York Knicks. On January 31, in a 102–88 win over the Dallas Mavericks, Chriss reached 100 career steals, three-pointers and blocks at 20 years, 213 days old. He became the third youngest player ever to reach 100 of each with only LeBron James and Kevin Durant doing so younger. On April 1, Chriss scored a season-high 22 points against the Golden State Warriors. He topped that mark on April 6 with 23 points against the New Orleans Pelicans.

=== Houston Rockets (2018–2019) ===
On August 31, 2018, Chriss was traded, alongside Brandon Knight, to the Houston Rockets in exchange for Ryan Anderson and De'Anthony Melton. On October 30, 2018, after missing the first five games of the season with a sprained left ankle, Chriss made his debut for the Rockets, recording four points and two rebounds in a 104–85 loss to the Portland Trail Blazers. The Rockets declined the $4 million option for the 2019–20 season on Chriss' rookie contract, which would make him a free agent at the conclusion of the season.

=== Cleveland Cavaliers (2019) ===
On February 7, 2019, Chriss was acquired by the Cleveland Cavaliers in a three-team trade involving the Rockets and Sacramento Kings. On March 12, Chriss was suspended for one game without pay due to an altercation with Serge Ibaka during a game against the Toronto Raptors.

=== Golden State Warriors (2019–2021) ===
On October 1, 2019, Chriss signed with the Golden State Warriors. He was waived by the Warriors on January 7, 2020, to make room for two-way contract player, Damion Lee, who was given a guaranteed contract for the remainder of the 2019–20 season. Chriss averaged 7.3 points and 5.4 rebounds per game, earning respect from teammates and coaches. The Warriors faced a hard cap that season that prevented them from keeping both Lee and Chriss. On January 15, the Warriors re-signed Chriss to a two-way contract, which was later converted into a 2-year rest-of-season contract. On December 26, 2020, Chriss suffered a broken right leg and missed the rest of the season.

On March 25, 2021, Chriss was traded along with cash considerations to the San Antonio Spurs in exchange for the draft rights to Cady Lalanne. Chriss was waived by the Spurs three days later.

On September 23, 2021, Chriss signed with the Portland Trail Blazers, but was waived on October 16 after four preseason games.

=== Dallas Mavericks (2021–2022) ===
On December 21, 2021, Chriss signed a 10-day contract with the Dallas Mavericks. He signed a second 10-day contract with the Mavericks on December 31, and signed a third 10-day contract on January 10, 2022. He signed a two-year contract on January 15.

On June 24, 2022, Chriss was traded alongside Boban Marjanović, Trey Burke, Sterling Brown, and the draft rights to Wendell Moore Jr. to the Houston Rockets in exchange for Christian Wood. On September 30, 2022, Chriss, Burke, Brown, and David Nwaba were traded to the Oklahoma City Thunder in exchange for Derrick Favors, Ty Jerome, Maurice Harkless, Théo Maledon and a future second-round pick. On October 17, Chriss was waived by the Thunder.

=== Wisconsin Herd (2024) ===
On February 1, 2024, Chriss joined the Wisconsin Herd of the NBA G League.

=== Shandong Hi-Speed Kirin (2024–2026) ===
On August 24, 2024, Chriss signed with Shandong Hi-Speed Kirin of the Chinese Basketball Association.

=== Liaoning Flying Leopards (2026–present) ===
On August 4, 2026, Chriss signed with the Liaoning Flying Leopards of the Chinese Basketball Association.

== Career statistics ==
Legend
GP	Games played	GS	Games started	MPG	Minutes per game
FG%	Field goal percentage	3P%	3-point field goal percentage	FT%	Free throw percentage
RPG	Rebounds per game	APG	Assists per game	SPG	Steals per game
BPG	Blocks per game	PPG	Points per game	**Bold**	Career high
*	Led the league

=== NBA ===
==== Regular season ====
Year	Team	GP	GS	MPG	FG%	3P%	FT%	RPG	APG	SPG	BPG	PPG
2016–17	Phoenix	**82***	**75**	**21.3**	.449	**.321**	.624	4.2	.7	**.8**	.9	9.2
2017–18	Phoenix	72	49	21.2	.423	.295	.608	5.5	1.2	.7	1.0	7.7
2018–19	Houston	16	0	6.5	.324	.067	**.857**	1.8	.4	.1	.3	1.8
2018–19	Cleveland	27	2	14.6	.384	.263	.684	4.2	.6	.6	.3	5.7
2019–20	Golden State	59	21	20.3	**.545**	.205	.769	6.2	**1.9**	.7	**1.1**	**9.3**
2020–21	Golden State	2	0	13.5	.357	.200	.500	**6.5**	1.0	.0	1.0	6.5
2021–22	Dallas	34	0	10.2	.463	.320	.667	3.0	.5	.4	.4	4.5
Career		292	147	18.3	.456	.290	.667	4.7	1.0	.6	.8	7.6

==== Playoffs ====
Year	Team	GP	GS	MPG	FG%	3P%	FT%	RPG	APG	SPG	BPG	PPG
2022	Dallas	8	0	3.8	.500	.500	.833	1.1	.0	.0	.0	1.8
Career		8	0	3.8	.500	.500	.833	1.1	.0	.0	.0	1.8

=== College ===
Year	Team	GP	GS	MPG	FG%	3P%	FT%	RPG	APG	SPG	BPG	PPG
2015–16	Washington	34	34	24.9	.530	.350	.682	5.4	.8	.9	1.6	13.7

== Personal life ==
Chriss is the fourth-oldest of 9 brothers and sisters. He has three older and three younger sisters, and is the oldest of four brothers. His father is Steven Chriss. His mother is Shawntae Wright, a licensed clinical social worker in Placer County, California. Chriss' stepfather, Michael Wright, had lived in Tacoma, Washington, and the visits to the Northwest were considered an influence to him going to the University of Washington.
