= 2021–22 Utah Jazz season =

American professional basketball season

- Division champions
- Head coach: Quin Snyder
- General manager: Justin Zanik
- Owner: Ryan Smith
- Arena: Vivint Arena

Results
- Record: 49–33 (.598)
- Place: Division: 1st (Northwest); Conference: 5th (Western)
- Playoff finish: First round (lost to Mavericks 2–4)
- Stats at Basketball Reference

Local media
- Television: AT&T SportsNet Rocky Mountain
- Radio: 1280; 97.5 The Zone

The 2021–22 Utah Jazz season was the 48th season of the franchise in the National Basketball Association (NBA), and the 43rd season of the franchise in Salt Lake City.

After a win against the Memphis Grizzlies in overtime on April 5, the Jazz clinched their sixth consecutive playoff appearance. The Jazz would play the Dallas Mavericks in the first round of the 2022 NBA playoffs where they lost the series in six games. This ended up being their final season with both Donovan Mitchell & Rudy Gobert, as both were traded to Cleveland & Minnesota in the offseason. As a result, this marks the last time Utah has qualified for the playoffs as of 2025.

== Draft picks ==
Round	Pick	Player	Position	Nationality	College
1	30	Santi Aldama	PF	Spain	Loyola (MD)

The Jazz entered the draft with one first-round selection. They had traded their second-round selection, which would turn out to be the final selection of the draft, to the Indiana Pacers in 2019.

== Roster ==
2021–22 Utah Jazz roster
Players

Pos.	No.	Player	Height	Weight	DOB	From
G	6	Nickeil Alexander-Walker	6 ft 5 in (1.96 m)	205 lb (93 kg)	1998-09-02	Virginia Tech
F/C	20	Udoka Azubuike	7 ft 0 in (2.13 m)	270 lb (122 kg)	1999-09-17	Kansas
F	44	Bojan Bogdanović	6 ft 7 in (2.01 m)	226 lb (103 kg)	1989-04-18	Croatia
G	13	Jared Butler	6 ft 3 in (1.91 m)	193 lb (88 kg)	2000-08-25	Baylor
G	00	Jordan Clarkson	6 ft 4 in (1.93 m)	194 lb (88 kg)	1992-06-07	Missouri
G	11	Mike Conley	6 ft 1 in (1.85 m)	175 lb (79 kg)	1987-10-11	Ohio State
G	3	Trent Forrest	6 ft 4 in (1.93 m)	210 lb (95 kg)	1998-06-12	Florida State
G/F	8	Rudy Gay	6 ft 8 in (2.03 m)	250 lb (113 kg)	1986-08-17	Connecticut
C	27	Rudy Gobert	7 ft 1 in (2.16 m)	258 lb (117 kg)	1992-06-26	France
F	41	Juancho Hernangómez	6 ft 9 in (2.06 m)	214 lb (97 kg)	1995-09-28	Spain
F	25	Danuel House	6 ft 7 in (2.01 m)	220 lb (100 kg)	1993-06-07	Texas A&M
G	45	Donovan Mitchell	6 ft 1 in (1.85 m)	215 lb (98 kg)	1996-09-07	Louisville
F	23	Royce O'Neale	6 ft 5 in (1.96 m)	226 lb (103 kg)	1993-06-05	Baylor
F	0	Eric Paschall	6 ft 6 in (1.98 m)	255 lb (116 kg)	1996-11-04	Villanova
F	19	Xavier Sneed (TW)	6 ft 5 in (1.96 m)	215 lb (98 kg)	1997-12-21	Kansas State
C	21	Hassan Whiteside	7 ft 0 in (2.13 m)	265 lb (120 kg)	1989-06-13	Marshall

Coaches
Head coach
- Quin Snyder
Assistant(s)
- Bryan Bailey
- Erdem Can
- Dell Demps
- Alex Jensen
- Vince Legarza
- Sergi Oliva
- Irv Roland
- Lamar Skeeter

Legend
- (DP) Unsigned draft pick
- (FA) Free agent
- (S) Suspended
- (GL) On assignment to G League affiliate
- (TW) Two-way affiliate player
- Injured

Roster
Updated: April 10, 2022

== Standings ==
=== Division ===
Northwest Division	W	L	PCT	GB	Home	Road	Div	GP
y – Utah Jazz	49	33	.598	–	29‍–‍12	20‍–‍21	15–1	82
x – Denver Nuggets	48	34	.585	1.0	23‍–‍18	25‍–‍16	6–10	82
x – Minnesota Timberwolves	46	36	.561	3.0	26‍–‍15	20‍–‍21	12–4	82
Portland Trail Blazers	27	55	.329	22.0	17‍–‍24	10‍–‍31	1–15	82
Oklahoma City Thunder	24	58	.293	25.0	12‍–‍29	12‍–‍29	6–10	82

=== Conference ===
Western Conference
#	Team	W	L	PCT	GB	GP
1	z – Phoenix Suns *	64	18	.780	–	82
2	y – Memphis Grizzlies *	56	26	.683	8.0	82
3	x – Golden State Warriors	53	29	.646	11.0	82
4	x – Dallas Mavericks	52	30	.634	12.0	82
5	y – Utah Jazz *	49	33	.598	15.0	82
6	x – Denver Nuggets	48	34	.585	16.0	82
7	x – Minnesota Timberwolves	46	36	.561	18.0	82
8	pi – Los Angeles Clippers	42	40	.512	22.0	82
9	x – New Orleans Pelicans	36	46	.439	28.0	82
10	pi − San Antonio Spurs	34	48	.415	30.0	82
11	Los Angeles Lakers	33	49	.402	31.0	82
12	Sacramento Kings	30	52	.366	34.0	82
13	Portland Trail Blazers	27	55	.329	37.0	82
14	Oklahoma City Thunder	24	58	.293	40.0	82
15	Houston Rockets	20	62	.244	44.0	82

== Game log ==
=== Preseason ===
2021 preseason game log
Total: 2–2 (home: 1–0; road: 1–2)
Preseason: 2–2 (home: 1–0; road: 1–2)

Game	Date	Team	Score	High points	High rebounds	High assists	Location Attendance	Record
1	October 4	@ San Antonio	L 85–111	Jared Butler (16)	Hassan Whiteside (10)	Elijah Hughes (4)	AT&T Center; 10,174	0–1
2	October 6	@ Dallas	L 101–111	Jared Butler (22)	Udoka Azubuike (14)	Trent Forrest (6)	American Airlines Center; 15,841	0–2
3	October 12	@ New Orleans	W 127–96	Rudy Gobert (19)	Rudy Gobert (19)	Conley, Mitchell (5)	Vivint Arena; 15,535	1–2
4	October 13	Milwaukee	W 124–120	Jordan Clarkson (18)	Jordan Clarkson (8)	Jared Butler (7)	Vivint Arena; 16,016	2–2

2021–22 preseason schedule

=== Regular season ===
2021–22 game log
Total: 49–33 (home: 29–12; road: 20–21
October: 5–1 (home: 2–0; road: 3–1)

Game	Date	Team	Score	High points	High rebounds	High assists	Location Attendance	Record
1	October 20	Oklahoma City	W 107–86	Bojan Bogdanović (22)	Rudy Gobert (21)	Conley Jr., Mitchell (4)	Vivint Arena; 18,306	1–0
2	October 22	@ Sacramento	W 110–101	Donovan Mitchell (27)	Rudy Gobert (20)	Donovan Mitchell (4)	Golden 1 Center; 17,583	2–0
3	October 26	Denver	W 122–110	Rudy Gobert (23)	Rudy Gobert (16)	Donovan Mitchell (6)	Vivint Arena; 18,306	3–0
4	October 28	@ Houston	W 122–91	Clarkson, Gobert (16)	Rudy Gobert (14)	Donovan Mitchell (6)	Toyota Center; 15,858	4–0
5	October 30	@ Chicago	L 99–107	Donovan Mitchell (30)	Rudy Gobert (19)	Donovan Mitchell (6)	United Center; 20,668	4–1
6	October 31	@ Milwaukee	W 107–95	Donovan Mitchell (28)	Rudy Gobert (13)	Conley Jr., Gobert, Mitchell, O'Neale (2)	Fiserv Forum; 17,341	5–1

November: 9–6 (home: 6–4; road: 3–2)

Game	Date	Team	Score	High points	High rebounds	High assists	Location Attendance	Record
7	November 2	Sacramento	W 119–113	Donovan Mitchell (36)	Rudy Gobert (20)	Donovan Mitchell (6)	Vivint Arena; 18,306	6–1
8	November 4	@ Atlanta	W 116–98	Jordan Clarkson (30)	Rudy Gobert (15)	Mike Conley Jr. (11)	State Farm Arena; 16,590	7–1
9	November 6	@ Miami	L 115–118	Donovan Mitchell (37)	Gobert, Whiteside (8)	Conley Jr., Mitchell (7)	FTX Arena; 19,600	7–2
10	November 7	@ Orlando	L 100–107	Gobert, Mitchell (21)	Rudy Gobert (15)	Donovan Mitchell (7)	Amway Center; 13,386	7–3
11	November 9	Atlanta	W 110–98	Donovan Mitchell (27)	Rudy Gobert (14)	Mike Conley Jr. (6)	Vivint Arena; 18,306	8–3
12	November 11	Indiana	L 101–111	Donovan Mitchell (26)	Rudy Gobert (11)	Mike Conley Jr. (8)	Vivint Arena; 18,306	8–4
13	November 13	Miami	L 105–111	Bojan Bogdanović (26)	Rudy Gobert (13)	Mike Conley Jr. (8)	Vivint Arena; 18,306	8–5
14	November 16	Philadelphia	W 120–85	Bojan Bogdanović (27)	Rudy Gobert (17)	Conley Jr., Ingles (7)	Vivint Arena; 18,306	9–5
15	November 18	Toronto	W 119–103	Gay, Mitchell (20)	Rudy Gobert (11)	Joe Ingles (8)	Vivint Arena; 18,306	10–5
16	November 20	@ Sacramento	W 123–105	Donovan Mitchell (26)	Rudy Gobert (14)	Donovan Mitchell (5)	Golden 1 Center; 13,180	11–5
17	November 22	Memphis	L 118–119	Bojan Bogdanović (24)	Rudy Gobert (13)	Conley, Mitchell (8)	Vivint Arena; 18,306	11–6
18	November 24	@ Oklahoma City	W 110–104	Jordan Clarkson (20)	Rudy Gobert (17)	Clarkson, Mitchell (5)	Paycom Center; 14,081	12–6
19	November 26	New Orleans	L 97–98	Bojan Bogdanović (23)	Rudy Gobert (10)	Donovan Mitchell (6)	Vivint Arena; 18,306	12–7
20	November 27	New Orleans	W 127–105	Donovan Mitchell (21)	Rudy Gobert (8)	Donovan Mitchell (7)	Vivint Arena; 18,306	13–7
21	November 29	Portland	W 129–107	Donovan Mitchell (30)	Rudy Gobert (16)	Conley Jr., Ingles (6)	Vivint Arena; 18,306	14–7

December: 12–2 (home: 6–2; road: 6–0)

Game	Date	Team	Score	High points	High rebounds	High assists	Location Attendance	Record
22	December 3	Boston	W 137–130	Donovan Mitchell (34)	Rudy Gobert (12)	Mike Conley Jr. (7)	Vivint Arena; 18,306	15–7
23	December 5	@ Cleveland	W 109–108	Donovan Mitchell (35)	Rudy Gobert (20)	Conley Jr., Mitchell (6)	Rocket Mortgage FieldHouse; 18,113	16–7
24	December 8	@ Minnesota	W 136–104	Donovan Mitchell (36)	Rudy Gobert (10)	Ingles, O'Neale (6)	Target Center; 15,181	17–7
25	December 9	@ Philadelphia	W 118–96	Donovan Mitchell (22)	Rudy Gobert (21)	Joe Ingles (7)	Wells Fargo Center; 20,272	18–7
26	December 11	@ Washington	W 123–98	Donovan Mitchell (28)	Hassan Whiteside (14)	Mike Conley Jr. (8)	Capital One Arena; 17,575	19–7
27	December 15	L.A. Clippers	W 124–103	Donovan Mitchell (27)	Rudy Gobert (17)	Donovan Mitchell (6)	Vivint Arena; 18,306	20–7
28	December 17	San Antonio	L 126–128	Donovan Mitchell (27)	Rudy Gobert (14)	Mike Conley Jr. (6)	Vivint Arena; 18,306	20–8
29	December 18	Washington	L 103–109	Donovan Mitchell (32)	Rudy Gobert (19)	Donovan Mitchell (5)	Vivint Arena; 18,306	20–9
30	December 20	Charlotte	W 112–102	Bogdanović, Gobert (23)	Rudy Gobert (21)	Donovan Mitchell (6)	Vivint Arena; 18,306	21–9
31	December 23	Minnesota	W 128–116	Donovan Mitchell (28)	Rudy Gobert (17)	Clarkson, Mitchell (7)	Vivint Arena; 18,306	22–9
32	December 25	Dallas	W 120–116	Donovan Mitchell (33)	Rudy Gobert (11)	Joe Ingles (6)	Vivint Arena; 18,306	23–9
33	December 27	@ San Antonio	W 110–104	Jordan Clarkson (23)	Rudy Gobert (13)	Jordan Clarkson (5)	AT&T Center; 16,255	24–9
34	December 29	@ Portland	W 120–105	Rudy Gobert (22)	Rudy Gobert (14)	Mike Conley (6)	Moda Center; 17,828	25–9
35	December 31	Minnesota	W 120–108	Donovan Mitchell (39)	Rudy Gobert (16)	Donovan Mitchell (5)	Vivint Arena; 18,306	26–9

January: 4–12 (home: 1–4; road: 3–8)

Game	Date	Team	Score	High points	High rebounds	High assists	Location Attendance	Record
36	January 1	Golden State	L 116–123	Bogdanović, Clarkson, Gobert, Mitchell (20)	Rudy Gobert (19)	Donovan Mitchell (9)	Vivint Arena; 18,306	26–10
37	January 3	@ New Orleans	W 115–104	Donovan Mitchell (29)	Rudy Gobert (17)	Mike Conley (7)	Smoothie King Center; 15,057	27–10
38	January 5	@ Denver	W 115–109	Bojan Bogdanović (36)	Bojan Bogdanović (13)	Mike Conley (6)	Ball Arena; 14,056	28–10
39	January 7	@ Toronto	L 108–122	Eric Paschall (29)	Elijah Hughes (8)	Trent Forrest (8)	Scotiabank Arena; 0	28–11
40	January 8	@ Indiana	L 113–125	Donovan Mitchell (36)	Hassan Whiteside (8)	Donovan Mitchell (9)	Gainbridge Fieldhouse; 13,160	28–12
41	January 10	@ Detroit	L 116–126	Donovan Mitchell (31)	Hassan Whiteside (14)	Mike Conley (8)	Little Caesars Arena; 17,834	28–13
42	January 12	Cleveland	L 91–111	Jordan Clarkson (22)	Royce O'Neale (9)	Donovan Mitchell (4)	Vivint Arena; 18,306	28–14
43	January 16	@ Denver	W 125–102	Donovan Mitchell (31)	Rudy Gobert (19)	Mike Conley (6)	Ball Arena; 15,647	29–14
44	January 17	@ L.A. Lakers	L 95–101	Mike Conley (20)	Rudy Gobert (16)	Donovan Mitchell (7)	Staples Center; 17,238	29–15
45	January 19	Houston	L 111–116	Bojan Bogdanović (29)	Joe Ingles (6)	Royce O'Neale (15)	Vivint Arena; 18,306	29–16
46	January 21	Detroit	W 111–101	Rudy Gobert (24)	Rudy Gobert (14)	Joe Ingles (5)	Vivint Arena; 18,306	30–16
47	January 23	@ Golden State	L 92–94	Bojan Bogdanović (21)	Rudy Gobert (18)	Joe Ingles (5)	Chase Center; 18,064	30–17
48	January 24	@ Phoenix	L 109–115	Jordan Clarkson (22)	Hassan Whiteside (9)	Jordan Clarkson (5)	Footprint Center; 17,071	30–18
49	January 26	Phoenix	L 97–105	Jordan Clarkson (26)	Hassan Whiteside (11)	Mike Conley (10)	Vivint Arena; 18,306	30–19
50	January 28	@ Memphis	L 109–119	Danuel House (21)	Hassan Whiteside (8)	Mike Conley (6)	FedEx Forum; 16,916	30–20
51	January 30	@ Minnesota	L 106–126	Bojan Bogdanović (23)	Hassan Whiteside (12)	Clarkson, Conley (5)	Target Center; 10,407	30–21

February: 8–1 (home: 7–0; road: 1–1)

Game	Date	Team	Score	High points	High rebounds	High assists	Location Attendance	Record
52	February 2	Denver	W 108–104	Trent Forrest (18)	Udoka Azubuike (10)	Trent Forrest (8)	Vivint Arena; 18,306	31–21
53	February 4	Brooklyn	W 125–102	Donovan Mitchell (27)	Azubuike, Bogdanović (11)	Trent Forrest (7)	Vivint Arena; 18,306	32–21
54	February 7	New York	W 113–104	Donovan Mitchell (32)	Udoka Azubuike (14)	Mike Conley (7)	Vivint Arena; 18,306	33–21
55	February 9	Golden State	W 111–85	Bojan Bogdanović (23)	Hassan Whiteside (17)	Donovan Mitchell (8)	Vivint Arena; 18,306	34–21
56	February 11	Orlando	W 114–99	Donovan Mitchell (24)	Hassan Whiteside (18)	Conley, O'Neale (5)	Vivint Arena; 18,306	35–21
57	February 14	Houston	W 135–101	Donovan Mitchell (30)	Hassan Whiteside (14)	Mike Conley (10)	Vivint Arena; 18,306	36–21
58	February 16	@ L.A. Lakers	L 101–106	Donovan Mitchell (37)	Rudy Gobert (11)	Conley, Mitchell (5)	Staples Center; 17,787	36–22
59	February 25	Dallas	W 114–109	Donovan Mitchell (33)	Rudy Gobert (17)	Conley, Mitchell (5)	Vivint Arena; 18,306	37–22
60	February 27	@ Phoenix	W 118–114	Donovan Mitchell (26)	Rudy Gobert (14)	Donovan Mitchell (5)	Footprint Center; 17,071	38–22

March: 8–9 (home: 5–1; road: 3–8)

Game	Date	Team	Score	High points	High rebounds	High assists	Location Attendance	Record
61	March 2	@ Houston	W 132–127 (OT)	Donovan Mitchell (37)	Rudy Gobert (17)	Donovan Mitchell (10)	Toyota Center; 13,583	39–22
62	March 4	@ New Orleans	L 90–124	Donovan Mitchell (14)	Hassan Whiteside (12)	Jordan Clarkson (4)	Smoothie King Center; 16,178	39–23
63	March 6	@ Oklahoma City	W 116–103	Bojan Bogdanović (35)	Rudy Gobert (17)	Donovan Mitchell (10)	Paycom Center; 15,079	40–23
64	March 7	@ Dallas	L 103–111	Bojan Bogdanović (21)	Rudy Gobert (13)	Donovan Mitchell (9)	American Airlines Center; 20,077	40–24
65	March 9	Portland	W 123–85	Bojan Bogdanović (27)	Gobert, O'Neale (10)	Donovan Mitchell (6)	Vivint Arena; 18,306	41–24
66	March 11	@ San Antonio	L 102–104	Donovan Mitchell (24)	Rudy Gobert (16)	Donovan Mitchell (6)	AT&T Center; 15,753	41–25
67	March 12	Sacramento	W 134–125	Jordan Clarkson (45)	Hassan Whiteside (21)	Donovan Mitchell (6)	Vivint Arena; 18,306	42–25
68	March 14	Milwaukee	L 111–117	Conley, Michell (29)	Rudy Gobert (14)	Donovan Mitchell (8)	Vivint Arena; 18,306	42–26
69	March 16	Chicago	W 125–110	Donovan Mitchell (37)	Rudy Gobert (20)	Mike Conley (7)	Vivint Arena; 18,306	43–26
70	March 18	L.A. Clippers	W 121–92	Jared Butler (21)	Rudy Gobert (16)	Jared Butler (7)	Vivint Arena; 18,306	44–26
71	March 20	@ New York	W 108–93	Donovan Mitchell (36)	Rudy Gobert (9)	Donovan Mitchell (6)	Madison Square Garden; 19,812	45–26
72	March 21	@ Brooklyn	L 106–114	Donovan Mitchell (30)	Royce O'Neale (8)	Mike Conley (7)	Barclays Center; 17,887	45–27
73	March 23	@ Boston	L 97–125	Donovan Mitchell (37)	Rudy Gobert (11)	Mike Conley (3)	TD Garden; N/A (Note: Spectators were in attendance, but the exact number was not reported.)	45–28
74	March 25	@ Charlotte	L 101–107	Donovan Mitchell (26)	Rudy Gobert (19)	Donovan Mitchell (7)	Spectrum Center; 19,162	45–29
75	March 27	@ Dallas	L 100–114	Rudy Gay (18)	Juancho Hernangómez (9)	Mike Conley (7)	American Airlines Center; 20,177	45–30
76	March 29	@ L.A. Clippers	L 115–121	Donovan Mitchell (33)	Rudy Gobert (16)	Donovan Mitchell (6)	Staples Center; 19,068	45–31
77	March 31	L.A. Lakers	W 122–109	Donovan Mitchell (29)	Rudy Gobert (17)	Donovan Mitchell (7)	Staples Center; 18,306	46–31

April: 3–2 (home: 2–1; road: 1–1)

Game	Date	Team	Score	High points	High rebounds	High assists	Location Attendance	Record
78	April 2	@ Golden State	L 107–111	Conley, Mitchell (26)	Rudy Gobert (20)	Mike Conley (8)	Chase Center; 18,064	46–32
79	April 5	Memphis	W 121–115 (OT)	Clarkson, Gobert (22)	Rudy Gobert (21)	Mike Conley (8)	Vivint Arena; 18,306	47–32
80	April 6	Oklahoma City	W 137–101	Bojan Bogdanović (27)	Hassan Whiteside (11)	Butler, Clarkson (10)	Vivint Arena; 18,306	48–32
81	April 8	Phoenix	L 105–111	Bojan Bogdanović (21)	Rudy Gobert (12)	Mike Conley (8)	Vivint Arena; 18,306	48–33
82	April 10	@ Portland	W 111–80	Juan Hernangómez (22)	Rudy Gobert (13)	Mike Conley (5)	Moda Center; 18,123	49–33

2021–22 season schedule

=== Playoffs ===
2022 playoff game log
Total: 2–4 (home: 1–2; road: 1–2)
First Round: 2–4 (home: 1–2; road: 1–2)

Game	Date	Team	Score	High points	High rebounds	High assists	Location Attendance	Series
1	April 16	@ Dallas	W 99–93	Donovan Mitchell (32)	Rudy Gobert (17)	Donovan Mitchell (6)	American Airlines Center; 20,013	1–0
2	April 18	@ Dallas	L 104–110	Donovan Mitchell (34)	Rudy Gobert (17)	Donovan Mitchell (5)	American Airlines Center; 20,113	1–1
3	April 21	Dallas	L 118–126	Donovan Mitchell (32)	Rudy Gobert (7)	Conley Jr., Mitchell 6	Vivint Arena; 18,306	1–2
4	April 23	Dallas	W 100–99	Jordan Clarkson (25)	Rudy Gobert (15)	Donovan Mitchell (7)	Vivint Arena; 18,306	2–2
5	April 25	@ Dallas	L 77–102	Jordan Clarkson (20)	Rudy Gobert (11)	Mike Conley Jr. (5)	American Airlines Center; 20,577	2–3
6	April 28	Dallas	L 96–98	Donovan Mitchell (39)	Rudy Gobert (12)	Donovan Mitchell (9)	Vivint Arena; 18,306	2–4

2021 playoff schedule

== Player statistics ==
Legend
GP	Games played	GS	Games started	MPG	Minutes per game
FG%	Field-goal percentage	3P%	3-point field-goal percentage	FT%	Free-throw percentage
RPG	Rebounds per game	APG	Assists per game	SPG	Steals per game
BPG	Blocks per game	PPG	Points per game

=== Regular season ===
Player	GP	GS	MPG	FG%	3P%	FT%	RPG	APG	SPG	BPG	PPG
Jordan Clarkson	79	1	27.1	.419	.318	.828	3.5	2.5	.8	.2	16.0
Royce O'Neale	77	77	31.2	.457	.389	.804	4.8	2.5	1.1	.4	7.4
Mike Conley Jr.	72	72	28.6	.435	.408	.796	3.0	5.3	1.3	.3	13.7
Bojan Bogdanović	69	69	30.9	.455	.387	.858	4.3	1.7	.5	.0	18.1
Donovan Mitchell	67	67	33.8	.448	.355	.853	4.2	5.3	1.5	.2	25.9
Rudy Gobert	66	66	32.1	.713	.000	.690	14.7	1.1	.7	2.1	15.6
Hassan Whiteside	65	8	17.9	.652		.623	7.6	.4	.3	1.6	8.2
Trent Forrest	60	6	12.8	.490	.185	.792	1.7	1.8	.5	.1	3.3
Eric Paschall	58	3	12.7	.485	.370	.767	1.8	.6	.2	.1	5.8
Rudy Gay	55	1	18.9	.414	.345	.785	4.4	1.0	.5	.3	8.1
Joe Ingles	45	15	24.9	.404	.347	.773	2.9	3.5	.5	.1	7.2
Jared Butler	42	1	8.6	.404	.318	.688	1.1	1.5	.4	.2	3.8
Danuel House Jr.^{†}	25	6	19.6	.447	.415	.692	2.7	1.0	.6	.5	6.8
Juancho Hernangómez^{†}	17	9	17.5	.507	.438	.476	3.5	.8	.5	.4	6.2
Udoka Azubuike	17	6	11.5	.755		.545	4.2	.0	.1	.6	4.7
Miye Oni	16	0	2.8	.222	.125	.000	.4	.3	.0	.0	.3
Nickeil Alexander-Walker^{†}	15	2	9.9	.333	.303	.917	1.5	1.1	.3	.3	3.5
Elijah Hughes^{†}	14	1	8.0	.417	.357	1.000	1.2	.4	.3	.1	3.1
Malik Fitts^{†}	7	0	5.0	.222	.500		1.4	.0	.0	.0	.9
Xavier Sneed^{†}	7	0	4.4	.250	.167		.6	.1	.0	.0	.7
Greg Monroe^{†}	3	0	8.7	.800		.571	3.0	1.0	.0	.3	4.0
Norvel Pelle	3	0	6.3	.600			2.0	.0	.0	.3	2.0
Denzel Valentine^{†}	2	0	9.0	.500	.333		2.0	.0	.5	.0	2.5
Zylan Cheatham	1	0	5.0	.000	.000		.0	.0	.0	.0	.0

=== Playoffs ===
Player	GP	GS	MPG	FG%	3P%	FT%	RPG	APG	SPG	BPG	PPG
Donovan Mitchell	6	6	38.2	.398	.208	.881	4.3	5.7	.7	.5	25.5
Bojan Bogdanović	6	6	35.7	.481	.333	.792	4.2	1.7	.3	.0	18.0
Rudy Gobert	6	6	32.8	.636		.682	13.2	.5	.2	1.0	12.0
Royce O'Neale	6	6	31.3	.400	.280	1.000	5.7	1.5	.5	.2	6.2
Mike Conley Jr.	6	6	29.0	.333	.200	.800	3.2	4.8	.8	.3	9.2
Jordan Clarkson	6	0	28.3	.548	.375	.889	3.2	1.3	.5	.2	17.5
Danuel House Jr.	6	0	18.7	.409	.200	.750	2.8	.7	.0	.2	4.3
Hassan Whiteside	6	0	10.8	.417		.250	5.2	.0	.3	1.3	1.8
Juancho Hernangómez	6	0	9.3	.278	.333		2.0	.8	.3	.0	2.3
Eric Paschall	4	0	6.0	.500	.500	1.000	1.3	.0	.3	.0	2.0
Nickeil Alexander-Walker	1	0	5.0	1.000		1.000	1.0	1.0	1.0	.0	5.0
Jared Butler	1	0	5.0	.000			1.0	.0	.0	.0	.0

- ^{†} Denotes player spent time with another team in the season. Stats reflect time with the Jazz only.

== Transactions ==
=== Trades ===
July 30, 2021
To Utah Jazz

2027 second-round pick
Cash considerations
To Oklahoma City Thunder

Derrick Favors
2024 protected first-round pick
August 7, 2021
To Utah Jazz

Draft rights to Jared Butler (No. 40)
2022 MEM second-round pick
2026 MEM second-round pick
To Memphis Grizzlies

Draft rights to Santi Aldama (No. 30)
August 7, 2021
To Utah Jazz

Eric Paschall
To Golden State Warriors

2026 MEM protected second-round pick
February 9, 2022
Three-team trade

To Portland Trail Blazers

- Elijah Hughes (from Utah)
- Joe Ingles (from Utah)
- 2022 MEM second-round pick (from Utah)
To San Antonio Spurs

- Tomáš Satoranský (from Portland)
- 2027 second-round pick (Note: The worst of the four picks originally belonging to Houston, Indiana, Miami, and Oklahoma City.) (from Utah)
To Utah Jazz

- Nickeil Alexander-Walker (from Portland)
- Juancho Hernangómez (from San Antonio)

=== Free agency ===
==== Re-signed ====
Player	Signed
Mike Conley Jr.	August 6, 2021

==== Additions ====
Player	Signed	Former team
Rudy Gay	August 6, 2021	San Antonio Spurs
Hassan Whiteside	August 6, 2021	Sacramento Kings

==== Subtractions ====
Player	Reason left	New team
Matt Thomas	Waived	
Georges Niang	Free agency	Philadelphia 76ers
