= Donovan Mitchell =

American basketball player (born 1996)

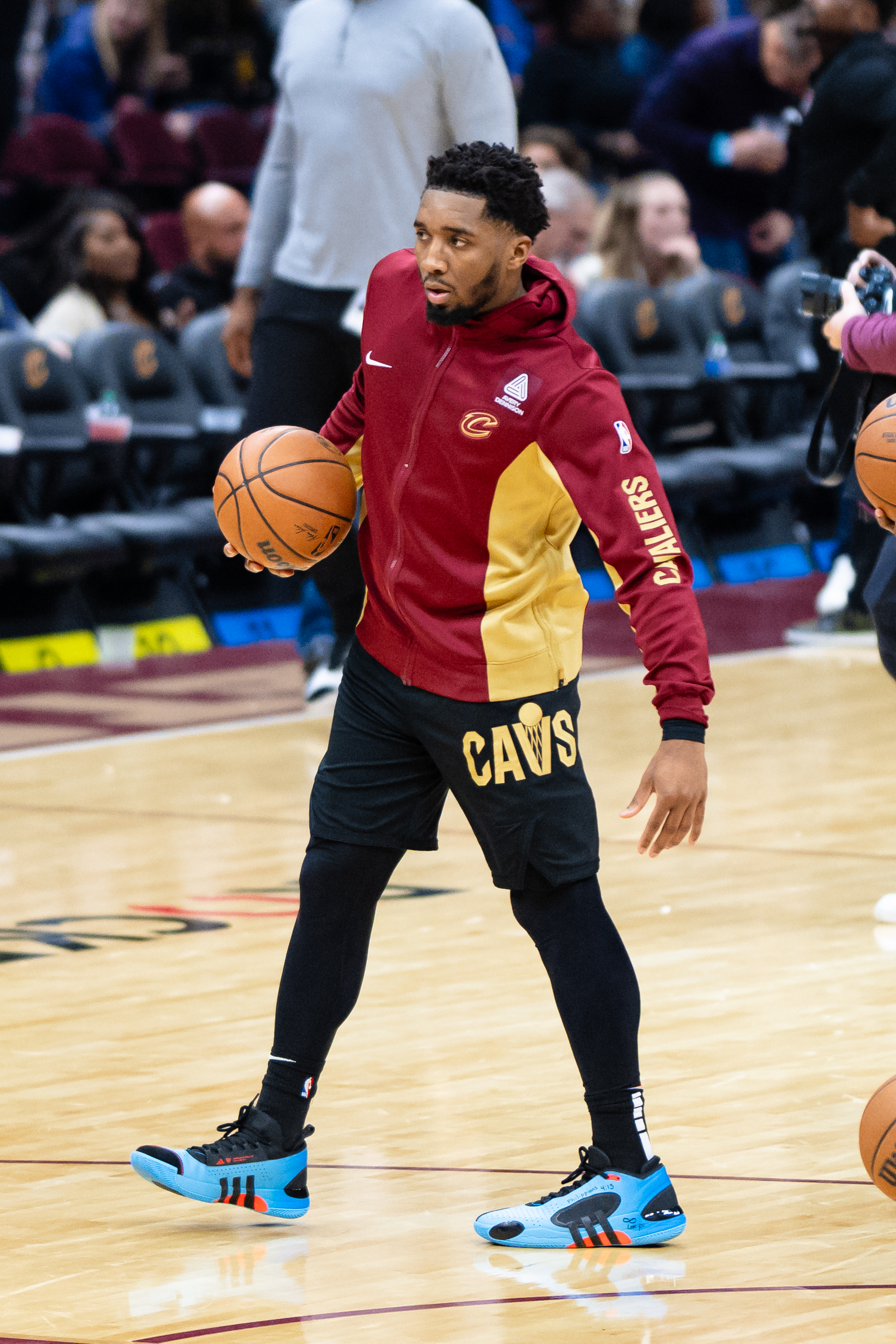
- Mitchell with the Cleveland Cavaliers in 2023

No. 45 – Cleveland Cavaliers
- Position: Shooting guard
- League: NBA

Personal information
- Born: September 7, 1996 (age 30) Elmsford, New York, U.S.
- Listed height: 6 ft 2 in (1.88 m)
- Listed weight: 228 lb (103 kg)

Career information
- High school: Canterbury School (New Milford, Connecticut); Brewster Academy (Wolfeboro, New Hampshire)
- College: Louisville (2015–2017)
- NBA draft: 2017: 1st round, 13th overall pick
- Drafted by: Denver Nuggets
- Playing career: 2017–present

Career history
- 2017–2022: Utah Jazz
- 2022–present: Cleveland Cavaliers

Career highlights
- 7× NBA All-Star (2020–2026); All-NBA First Team (2025); 2× All-NBA Second Team (2023, 2026); NBA All-Rookie First Team (2018); NBA Slam Dunk Contest champion (2018); First-team All-ACC (2017)
- Stats at NBA.com
- Stats at Basketball Reference

Donovan Vernell Mitchell Jr. (born September 7, 1996) is an American professional basketball player for the Cleveland Cavaliers of the National Basketball Association (NBA). Nicknamed "Spida", he was drafted in the first round of the 2017 NBA draft and acquired by the Utah Jazz, whom he played for from 2017 to 2022. He is a seven-time NBA All-Star and three-time All-NBA Team member.

Mitchell played college basketball for the Louisville Cardinals, earning first-team all-conference honors in the Atlantic Coast Conference (ACC) in 2017. As a rookie with the Utah Jazz, he was named to the NBA All-Rookie First Team and won the Slam Dunk Contest in 2018. He was traded from the Jazz to the Cavaliers in 2022 where he would lead Cleveland to the postseason for the first time since the 2017–18 season and the first without LeBron James since 1997–98. That season, he scored a Cavaliers record 71 points in a game. In 2025, he was named to the All-NBA First Team after leading Cleveland to the best record in the Eastern Conference.

== Early life ==
Mitchell was born on September 7, 1996, to parents Donovan Sr. and Nicole in Elmsford, New York. His mother, who is of Panamanian and African American descent, is a teacher, and his African American father is a former Minor League Baseball player. With his father serving as a director of player relations for the New York Mets, Mitchell spent his childhood around Major League Baseball (MLB) locker rooms. At seven years old, he idolized a star pitcher of the Mets' minor-league system Scott Kazmir and later to David Wright, who was the first poster he hung on his wall. When he was eight, he played AAU basketball for the Riverside Hawks out of New York City with future Cavaliers teammate, Ty Jerome. Mitchell also played AAU for The City program in New York City. In 2010, Mitchell was present at the Boys and Girls Club of Greenwich (Conn.) when LeBron James announced his decision to sign with the Miami Heat. Mitchell has one younger sister named Jordan.

== High school career ==
Mitchell attended Canterbury School in New Milford for his first two years of high school, after having graduated from Greenwich Country Day School likewise in Connecticut. Besides basketball, Mitchell played baseball for Canterbury. He stopped playing baseball after an injury, which also ended his upcoming AAU season. For his junior and senior years, he transferred to Brewster Academy, competing in NEPSAC. Focusing on basketball and joining Brewster's nationally prominent program, Mitchell garnered considerably more attention from college basketball coaches. He won two prep school national championships with Brewster. As he would later do in college, Mitchell spent his summers playing in streetball games at the famed Rucker Park in New York City. Mitchell was invited to play in the regional game for the Jordan Brand Classic, ranking twenty-seventh in the 2015 class by one recruiting service and forty-third by another. He committed to the University of Louisville to play college basketball.

== College career ==
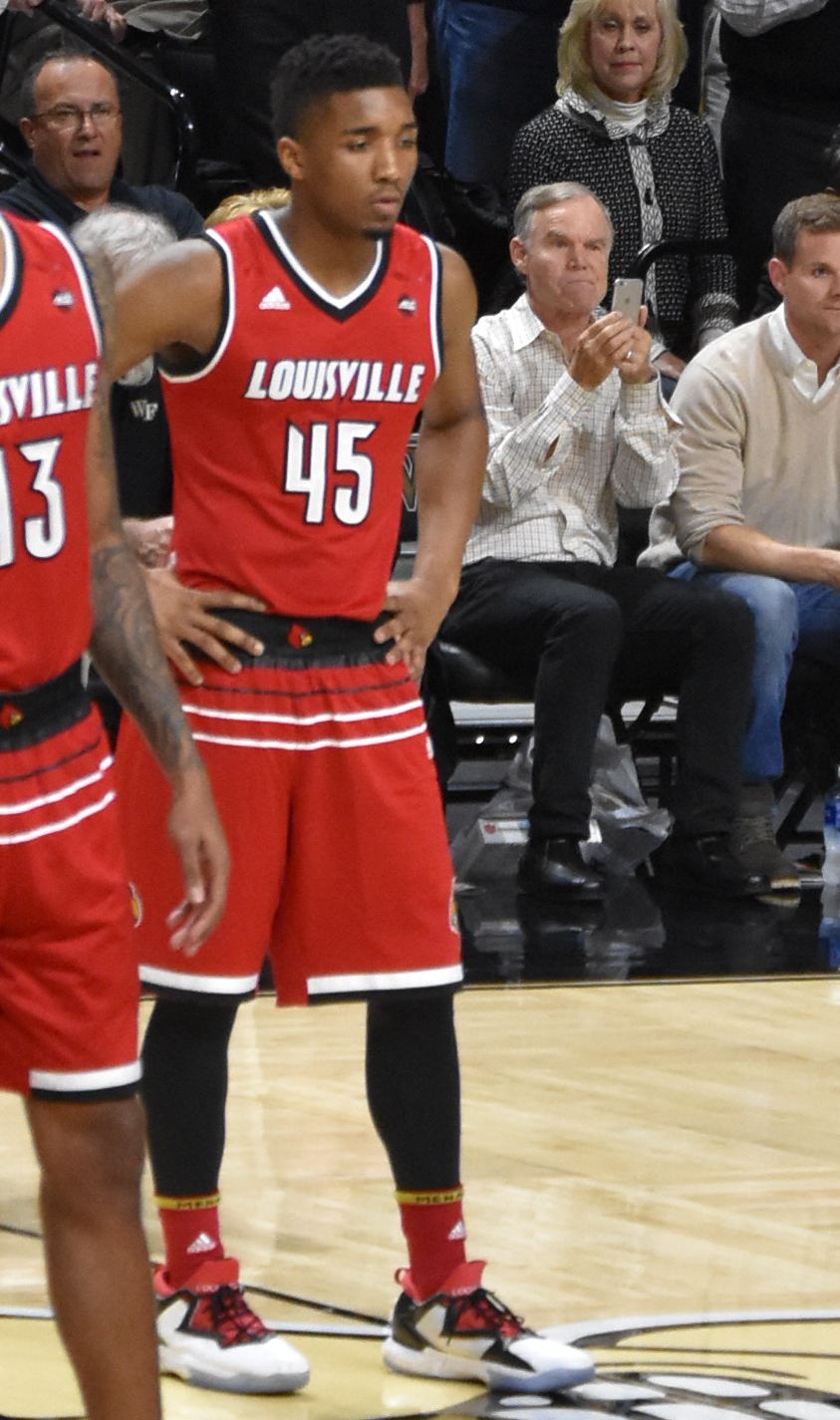
Mitchell playing for Louisville in 2017

Mitchell opted to wear number 45 on his jersey in appreciation for Michael Jordan, who took the same number during his baseball career and the early part of his NBA comeback in 1995. As a freshman at the University of Louisville, Mitchell started in no more than five games and averaged 7.4 points, 1.7 assists, and 3.4 rebounds for the season.

Over his sophomore season, Mitchell averaged 15.6 points, 2.7 assists, and 4.9 rebounds per game, while shooting 46.3 percent from the floor as well as 35.4 from behind the arc and 80.6 percent from the free-throw line. He was named first-team All-Atlantic Coast Conference. Though he did not immediately hire an agent, Mitchell declared for the 2017 NBA draft on the heels of his sophomore campaign.

== Professional career ==
=== Utah Jazz (2017–2022) ===
==== 2017–18 season: All-Rookie honors ====
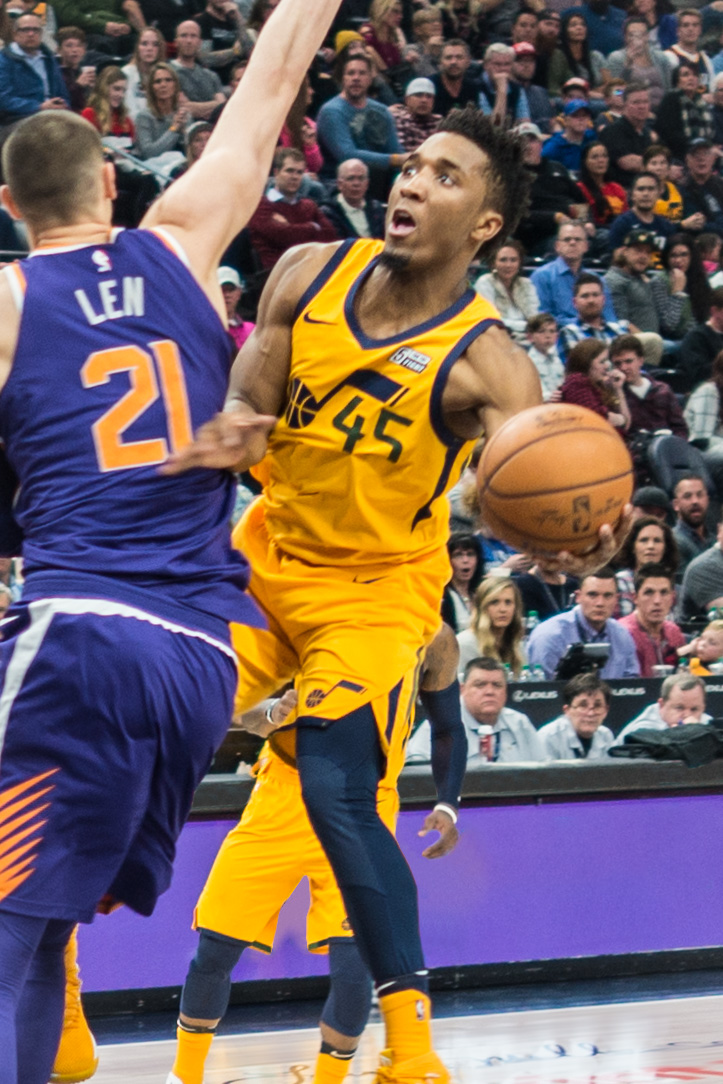
Mitchell playing for Utah Jazz in 2018

Mitchell was drafted by the Denver Nuggets with the 13th overall pick in the 2017 NBA draft only to be traded to the Utah Jazz for the 24th pick (Tyler Lydon) and Trey Lyles. On July 5, 2017, Mitchell signed a four-year rookie scale contract with the Jazz. On July 11, 2017, Mitchell signed a multi-year shoe deal with Adidas. Later that day, Mitchell scored 37 points against the Memphis Grizzlies in the 2017 NBA Summer League in Las Vegas, the most by any player during the 2017 NBA Summer League. In his NBA debut on October 18, 2017, Mitchell registered 10 points and four assists against the Denver Nuggets. On December 1, 2017, he scored a career-high 41 points in a 114–108 win over the New Orleans Pelicans. He set the Jazz scoring record for a rookie and became the first NBA rookie to score 40 points in a game since Blake Griffin in 2011. He surpassed Darrell Griffith's team-record 38 in 1981. Mitchell also became the seventh rookie in franchise history to have a 30-plus point game, as well as the first to have a 40-plus point game. On January 4, 2018, Mitchell was named the Western Conference Rookie of the Month for December 2017 after averaging 23.1 points, 3.4 assists, 3.2 rebounds, and 1.8 steals in 34.3 minutes per game during the month of December. On January 15, 2018, Mitchell surpassed Karl Malone's franchise record for most 20+ points games during a rookie season when he had his 19th 20+ point game. On February 2, 2018, Mitchell recorded his second 40-point game of his rookie season against the Phoenix Suns, becoming the first rookie guard to notch two 40-point games since Allen Iverson in 1996–97. On February 5, 2018, Mitchell was named by the NBA as an injury replacement for Orlando Magic forward Aaron Gordon (strained left hip flexor) for the 2018 NBA Slam Dunk Contest. He won the contest scoring a 48 and 50 in the first round, then a 50 and 48 in the final round being the first rookie to win the contest since Zach LaVine. On March 1, 2018, Mitchell was named as the Western Conference Rookie of the month for the third time that season for games played in February. On April 10, he set a rookie record for most three-pointers in a season with 186 three-pointers during a 119–79 win over the Golden State Warriors. On April 12, at the end of the regular season, Mitchell was named Western Conference Rookie of the Month for March and April.

In Mitchell's playoff debut against the Oklahoma City Thunder on April 15, he recorded 27 points, 10 rebounds, and three assists. He bruised his foot during the game and was questionable for Game 2, but was able to play, scoring 28 points, including 13 in the fourth quarter to lead the Jazz to a 102–95 win. Mitchell set a new record for points by a shooting guard in the team's first two postseason games with 55 points, breaking Michael Jordan's record of 53 points. Mitchell led the Jazz to a 4–2 series win over the Thunder, averaging 28.5 points a game on 46.2 percent shooting. His 171 points in the series were the third-most ever by a rookie in his first six playoff games, behind only Kareem Abdul-Jabbar and Wilt Chamberlain. His 38 points in Game 6 (on 14-of-26 shooting) marked the highest scoring output by a rookie in a series-clinching win since 1980. On May 22, 2018, he was named to the NBA All-Rookie First Team.

==== 2018–19 season: Improving as a sophomore ====
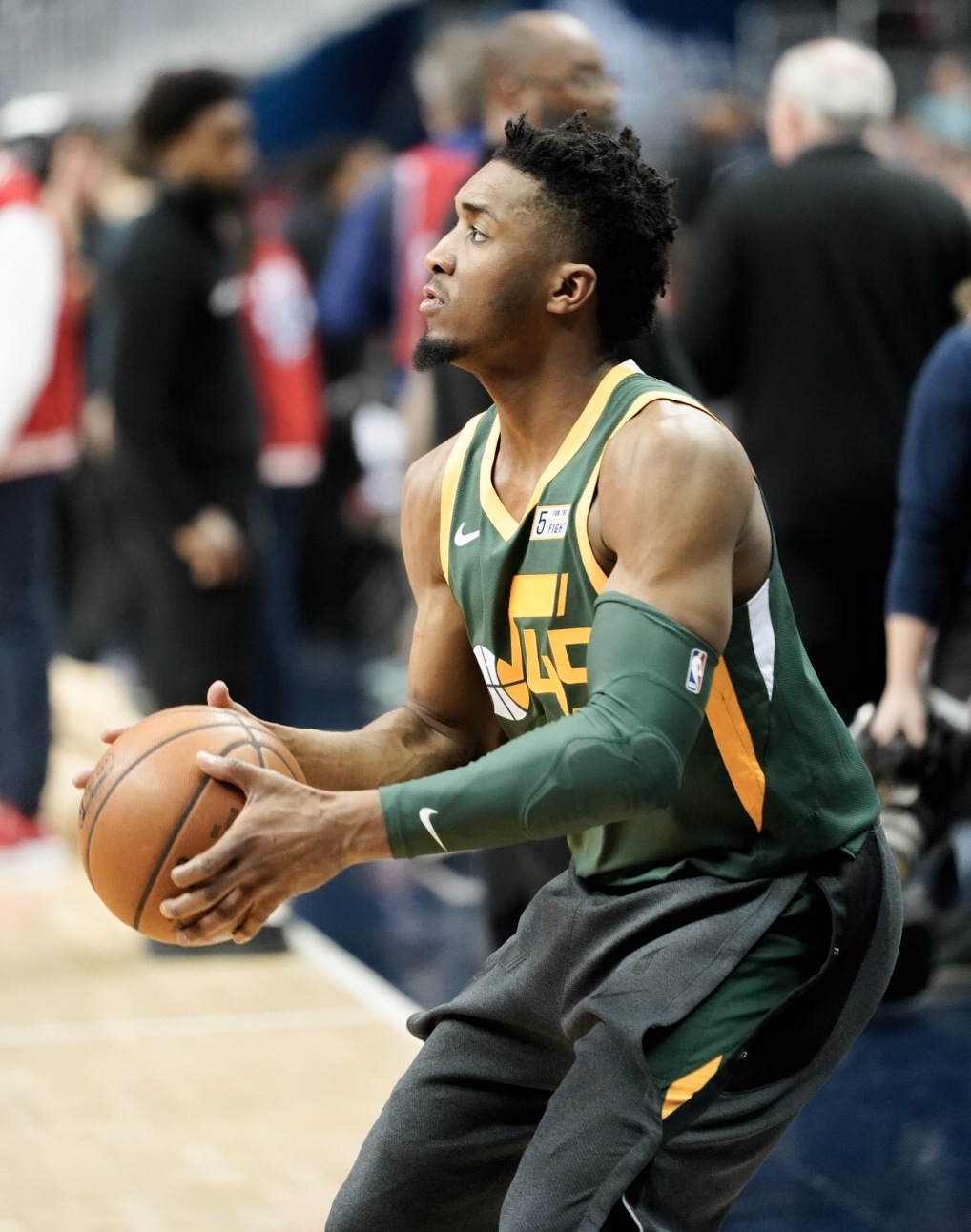
Mitchell with the Jazz in 2019

On October 24, 2018, Mitchell scored a season-high 38 points in a 100–89 win over the Houston Rockets. On January 25, 2019, Mitchell recorded his first and only double-double of the season, with 24 points and 11 assists, in a 106–102 victory over the Minnesota Timberwolves Mitchell recorded a total of five 30-point games in the month of January, including three consecutive such games, earning him Western Conference Player of the Week for the week of January 6–13. On February 22, Mitchell tied his season-high 38 points in a 148–147 double overtime loss to the Oklahoma City Thunder. On March 2, Mitchell scored a career-high 46 points in 115–111 win over the Milwaukee Bucks. Six days later, Mitchell once again recorded 38 points in a 114–104 loss to the Memphis Grizzlies. On March 29, Mitchell scored 35 points in a 128–124 victory over the Washington Wizards. On April 9, Mitchell tied his career-high 46 points in the regular season finale, as the Jazz topped the Denver Nuggets, 118–108.

The Jazz would once again be eliminated in the postseason by the Rockets in five games, this time in the first round. Mitchell struggled mightily in the first two games, being held to just 19 and 11 points respectively. He scored 34 points in the 104–101 loss in Game 3, before scoring 31 points in Game 4, the lone Utah victory.

==== 2019–20 season: First All-Star selection ====
Mitchell opened the 2019–20 season with a 32-point, 12-assist performance in a 105–95 win over the Oklahoma City Thunder on October 23, 2019. On November 3, Mitchell scored a then season-high 36 points in a 105–94 loss to the Los Angeles Clippers. On November 23, he surpassed that season-high with 37 points in a 128–120 victory over the New Orleans Pelicans. On December 28, Mitchell recorded 30 points, seven rebounds, and nine assists in a 120–107 win over the Clippers. On January 16, 2020, Mitchell tied his career-high 46 points in a 138–132 overtime loss to the Pelicans. On January 30, Mitchell was named an All-Star for the first time in his career, being selected as a Western Conference reserve for the 2020 NBA All-Star Game. On February 24, Mitchell scored 38 points in a 131–111 loss to the Phoenix Suns, before scoring 37 points two days later, in a 114–103 loss to the Boston Celtics.

On March 11, 2020, Mitchell and teammate Rudy Gobert tested positive for COVID-19, resulting in the NBA suspending its season. The league was later reinstated within the NBA Bubble four months later, where the Jazz obtained the sixth seed and faced the Denver Nuggets in the first round. On August 17, 2020, Mitchell scored 57 points in a 125–135 overtime loss to the Nuggets, the third most in playoff history. Six days later, he scored 51 points to join Michael Jordan and Allen Iverson as the only players to score 50 or more points twice in a playoff series.

During the shortened 2020 off-season, Mitchell signed a five-year rookie extension with the Jazz, paying him at least $163 million with an incentivized maximum of $195 million.

==== 2020–21 season: Best record in the NBA ====
On February 23, 2021, Mitchell was named a Western Conference reserve for the 2021 NBA All-Star Game, marking his second consecutive All-Star selection. Despite a mid-April ankle sprain against the Indiana Pacers, which would sideline Mitchell for the final sixteen games of the regular season, the Jazz finished with the NBA's top seed and home-court advantage throughout the entire postseason for the first time since 1997–98.

After defeating the Memphis Grizzlies in the First Round in five games, Utah would advance to play the Los Angeles Clippers in the Conference Semi-Finals, where in Game 1, Mitchell would score 45 points in a 112–109 victory. He followed that performance with a 37-point outing in Game 2, as Utah topped the Clippers 117–111 en route to a 2–0 series lead. Mitchell had a huge Game 6 with 39 points, nine rebounds, and nine assists on 12-of-27 shooting (9-of-15 from three) despite being questionable with an ankle injury. The Jazz were eliminated after their fourth straight loss to Clippers.

==== 2021–22 season: Final season in Utah ====
On February 3, 2022, Mitchell was named a Western Conference reserve for the 2022 NBA All-Star Game, marking his third consecutive All-Star selection. On April 16, during Game 1 of the first round of the playoffs, he logged 32 points, six rebounds, and six assists in a 99–93 win over the Dallas Mavericks. Utah would go on to lose to Dallas in six games despite Mitchell's 23-point, 8-rebound and 9-assist outing in a tightly contested 98–96 loss in Game 6. After another playoff disappointment, the Jazz decided to trade both Mitchell and Gobert in the off-season.

=== Cleveland Cavaliers (2022–present) ===
==== 2022–23 season: First All-NBA team selection ====
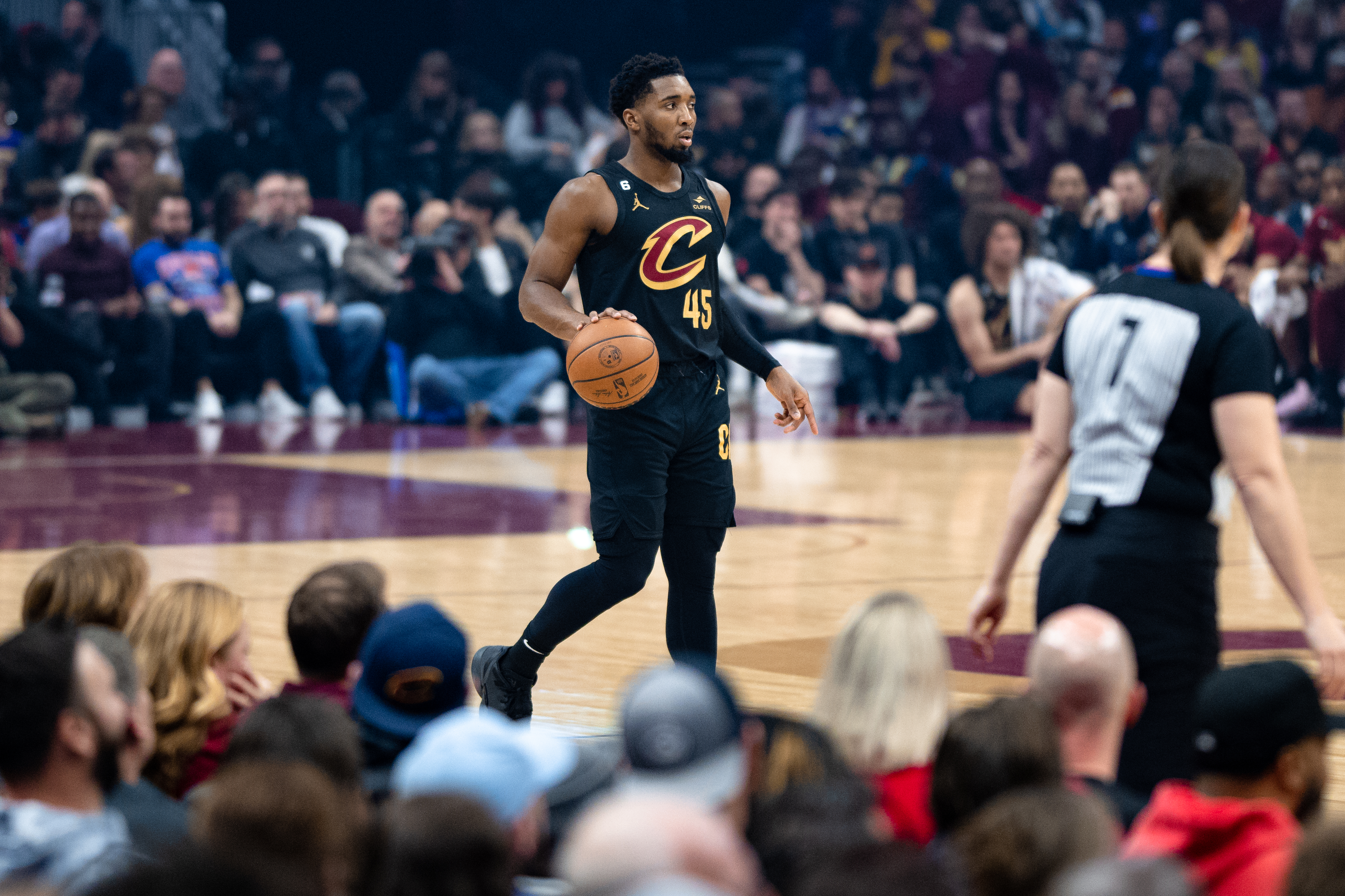
Mitchell in 2022

On September 1, 2022, Mitchell was traded to the Cleveland Cavaliers for Lauri Markkanen, Collin Sexton, Ochai Agbaji, three first-round picks, and two pick swaps. He made his regular season debut on October 19, putting up 31 points and nine assists in a 108–105 loss to the Toronto Raptors. On October 28, Mitchell scored 41 points in a 132–123 overtime win over the Boston Celtics. With teammate Caris LeVert also scoring 41 points in that same game, it was the first time the Cavaliers had multiple 40-point scorers in one game since Game 5 of the 2016 NBA Finals, when LeBron James and Kyrie Irving both had 41. The next game, Mitchell had a career-high 12 assists and scored 38 points in a 121–108 win over the New York Knicks. On December 6, Mitchell scored 43 points on 17-of-27 shooting from the field in a 116–102 win over the Los Angeles Lakers.

On January 2, 2023, Mitchell scored an NBA season-high, career-high, and Cavaliers-record 71 points, along with eight rebounds and 11 assists, in a 145–134 overtime win over the Chicago Bulls. It was the highest-scoring game for any NBA player since Kobe Bryant's 81-point game in 2006. Mitchell became the seventh player in NBA history to score 70 or more points in a game, and the first to do so with at least 10 assists. On January 26, Mitchell was named an Eastern Conference starter for the 2023 NBA All-Star Game, marking his fourth consecutive selection and first one as a starter. On March 31, Mitchell scored 42 points in a 130–116 loss against the New York Knicks. He also surpassed LeBron James for the most 40-point games in a season by a Cavalier with 11. On April 4, Mitchell scored 43 points, his fourth straight 40-point game, to lead the Cleveland Cavaliers to a 117–113 victory over the Orlando Magic. He became the first Cavalier to score 40 or more points in four straight games. Mitchell with his performance also secured the No. 4 seed in the Eastern Conference and home-court advantage in the first round for the Cavaliers and their first 50-win season since 1993 without LeBron James on the roster.

On April 15, Mitchell in his Cavs playoff debut recorded 38 points, five rebounds, eight assists and three steals in a 101–97 loss against the New York Knicks. Mitchell's 38 points set a team record for scoring in a player playoff debut, and he also joined elite company by becoming the first player to score more than 30 points in 20 of his first 40 playoff games since Allen Iverson. In Game 2 of the Cavaliers first round playoff series against the New York Knicks, Mitchell recorded a playoff career-high 13 assists in a 107–90 win to tie the series at a game apiece. The Cavaliers were eliminated after their third straight loss to the Knicks despite a 28-point, 7-rebound and 5-assist performance by Mitchell in Game 5.

==== 2023–24 season: First Eastern Conference Semifinals appearance ====
On March 3, 2024, Mitchell fractured his nose after receiving an elbow from teammate Tristan Thompson, forcing him to miss a game on March 18 against the Indiana Pacers. In March, Mitchell also built up a bone bruise in his left knee, causing him to miss seven games. On March 11, Mitchell was sent to the NBA G-League and was recalled the day after. On March 19, Mitchell underwent a procedure to repair his nasal fracture, removing him from play for at least a week.

In Game 6 of the first round of the playoffs against the Orlando Magic, Mitchell scored 50 points in a 103–96 loss. He scored 52.1% of the Cavaliers' points in Game 6, the most by a player with an opportunity to clinch a playoff series in NBA history. The only other player to score at least half of his team's points in a clinching scenario was Michael Jordan in Game 6 of the 1998 NBA Finals. On May 5, Mitchell recorded 39 points, nine rebounds and five assists in a 106–94 Game 7 victory, thus sending the Cavaliers past the Magic to the Eastern Conference Semifinals. Cleveland won its first playoff series without LeBron James since 1993. He scored a combined 89 points in Games 6 and 7, one shy of a record set by Allen Iverson (90 points), but set a record for the most points by a player in franchise history in that span. In the Conference Semifinals against the Boston Celtics, he missed Games 4 and 5 due to a left calf strain, as the Cavaliers were eliminated in five games.

==== 2024–25 season: All-NBA First Team selection and best Eastern Conference record ====
On July 7, 2024, the Cavaliers signed Mitchell to a three-year, $150.3 million contract extension. On November 2, Mitchell scored the game-winning shot against the Milwaukee Bucks and finished with 30 points, three rebounds, and four assists in a 114–113 victory. On January 25, 2025, Mitchell was named an Eastern Conference starter for the 2025 NBA All-Star Game, marking his sixth consecutive selection and his second selection as a starter. On February 28, Mitchell scored a season-high 41 points in a come-from-behind 123–116 victory over the Boston Celtics, rallying from a 22-point deficit. Mitchell led the Cavaliers to the best record in the Eastern Conference at 64–18, marking the second-best regular season record in franchise history. He also became just the third player in franchise history to be named to the All-NBA First Team, joining Mark Price and LeBron James.

On May 4, Mitchell scored 33 points in a 121–112 loss to the Indiana Pacers in Game 1 of the Conference Semifinals. He broke a record previously held by Michael Jordan with eight consecutive playoff games with at least 30 points in a series opener. He followed this up by scoring 48 points in a Game 2 loss and 43 points in a Game 3 victory. He joined LeBron James as the only players in franchise history to record back-to-back 40-point games in the playoffs. In the Game 4 loss, he suffered an injury in his left ankle during a halftime warm-up, and was sidelined for the entire second half. Mitchell started Game 5 despite the injury, but the Cavaliers were eliminated in a 114–105 closeout loss, despite his 35 points, nine rebounds, and four steals.

==== 2025–26 season: Playoff single-half scoring record & Eastern Conference Finals ====
On November 5, 2025, Mitchell scored a then season-high 46 points on 15-of-21 shooting (6-of-11 from three) and added 8 assists, leading the Cavaliers to a 132–121 win over the Philadelphia 76ers. On November 10, Mitchell recorded 28 points, a career-high 15 rebounds, and 8 assists, including a 3-pointer with 0.4 seconds left in overtime to tie the game, but the Cavaliers were ultimately edged out at the buzzer 140–138 by the Miami Heat. On December 12, Mitchell scored a season-high 48 points, including 24 in the fourth quarter, leading the Cavaliers back from a 15-point deficit in the final period to a 130–126 victory over the Washington Wizards. On January 26, 2026, Mitchell scored 45 points on 15/25 shooting, leading the Cavaliers to an 114–98 win over the Orlando Magic. On February 1, Mitchell was named an Eastern Conference reserve for the 2026 NBA All-Star Game, marking his seventh consecutive selection.

On May 11, in Game 4 of the Eastern Conference semifinals, Mitchell scored 43 points, including 39 in the second half, to lead the Cavaliers to a 112–103 victory over the Detroit Pistons and tie the series at 2–2. His 39 points in the second half tied Sleepy Floyd (1987) for the most points scored in a single playoff half and passed Kevin Durant (38 in 2019) for the most in the play by play era. His total of 43 points marked his fourth 40-point playoff game in his Cavaliers career, passing Kyrie Irving for the second-most in franchise history. In Game 7 of the Eastern Conference semifinals, Mitchell recorded 26 points, six rebounds, and eight assists with zero turnovers, leading the Cavaliers to a 125–94 road victory over the Pistons to clinch their first Eastern Conference Finals appearance since 2017–18. It was also the first Conference Finals appearance of his career. He also became only the second player in NBA history, alongside Kobe Bryant, to record at least 25 points, five rebounds, five assists, and zero turnovers in a Game 7.

==== 2026–27 season: Record contract extension ====
On July 7, 2026, Mitchell signed a four-year, $273 million extension with the Cavaliers, keeping him under contract through the 2030–31 season. This extension would set a new record for average annual salary at $68 million, surpassing Shai Gilgeous-Alexander's extension from the year prior, and ranked as the fourth-biggest in terms of total value.

== Awards and honors ==
- 7× NBA All-Star: 2020–2026
- 3× All-NBA Team selections:
  - All-NBA First Team: 2025
  - 2× All-NBA Second Team: 2023, 2026
- NBA All-Rookie First Team: 2018
- NBA Slam Dunk Contest champion: 2018

== Career statistics ==
Legend
GP	Games played	GS	Games started	MPG	Minutes per game
FG%	Field goal percentage	3P%	3-point field goal percentage	FT%	Free throw percentage
RPG	Rebounds per game	APG	Assists per game	SPG	Steals per game
BPG	Blocks per game	PPG	Points per game	**Bold**	Career high
*	Led the league

=== NBA ===
==== Regular season ====
Year	Team	GP	GS	MPG	FG%	3P%	FT%	RPG	APG	SPG	BPG	PPG
2017–18	Utah	**79**	71	33.4	.437	.340	.805	3.7	3.7	1.5	.3	20.5
2018–19	Utah	77	**77**	33.7	.432	.362	.806	4.1	4.2	1.4	.4	23.8
2019–20	Utah	69	69	34.3	.449	.366	.863	4.4	4.3	1.0	.2	24.0
2020–21	Utah	53	53	33.4	.438	**.386**	.845	4.4	5.2	1.0	.3	26.4
2021–22	Utah	67	67	33.8	.448	.355	.853	4.2	5.3	1.5	.2	25.9
2022–23	Cleveland	68	68	**35.8**	**.484**	**.386**	**.867**	4.3	4.4	1.5	.4	**28.3**
2023–24	Cleveland	55	55	35.3	.462	.368	.865	**5.1**	**6.1**	**1.8**	**.5**	26.6
2024–25	Cleveland	71	71	31.4	.443	.368	.823	4.5	5.0	1.3	.2	24.0
2025–26	Cleveland	70	70	33.5	.483	.364	.865	4.5	5.7	1.5	.3	27.9
Career		609	601	33.8	.453	.366	.844	4.3	4.8	1.4	.3	25.1
All-Star		6	2	20.5	.432	.400	1.000	4.3	4.7	1.3	.5	14.3

==== Playoffs ====
Year	Team	GP	GS	MPG	FG%	3P%	FT%	RPG	APG	SPG	BPG	PPG
2018	Utah	11	11	37.4	.420	.313	.907	**5.9**	4.2	1.5	.4	24.4
2019	Utah	5	5	38.6	.321	.256	.727	5.0	3.2	1.6	.2	21.4
2020	Utah	7	7	37.7	**.529**	**.516**	**.948**	5.0	4.9	1.0	.3	**36.3***
2021	Utah	10	10	34.6	.447	.435	.829	4.2	5.5	1.1	.2	32.3
2022	Utah	6	6	38.2	.398	.208	.881	4.3	5.7	.7	.5	25.5
2023	Cleveland	5	5	**41.3**	.433	.289	.722	5.0	**7.2**	**2.0**	**.6**	23.2
2024	Cleveland	10	10	38.2	.476	.354	.815	5.4	4.7	1.3	.3	29.6
2025	Cleveland	9	9	32.0	.443	.333	.742	4.7	3.9	1.9	.3	29.6
2026	Cleveland	**18**	**18**	36.2	.451	.327	.815	4.8	3.1	1.2	.3	26.0
Career		81	81	36.7	.442	.349	.824	5.0	4.4	1.3	.3	27.8

=== College ===
Year	Team	GP	GS	MPG	FG%	3P%	FT%	RPG	APG	SPG	BPG	PPG
2015–16	Louisville	31	5	19.1	**.442**	.250	.754	3.4	1.7	.8	.1	7.4
2016–17	Louisville	**34**	**33**	**32.3**	.408	**.354**	**.806**	**4.9**	**2.7**	**2.1**	**.5**	**15.6**
Career		65	38	26.0	.418	.329	.788	4.1	2.2	1.5	.3	11.7

== Personal life ==
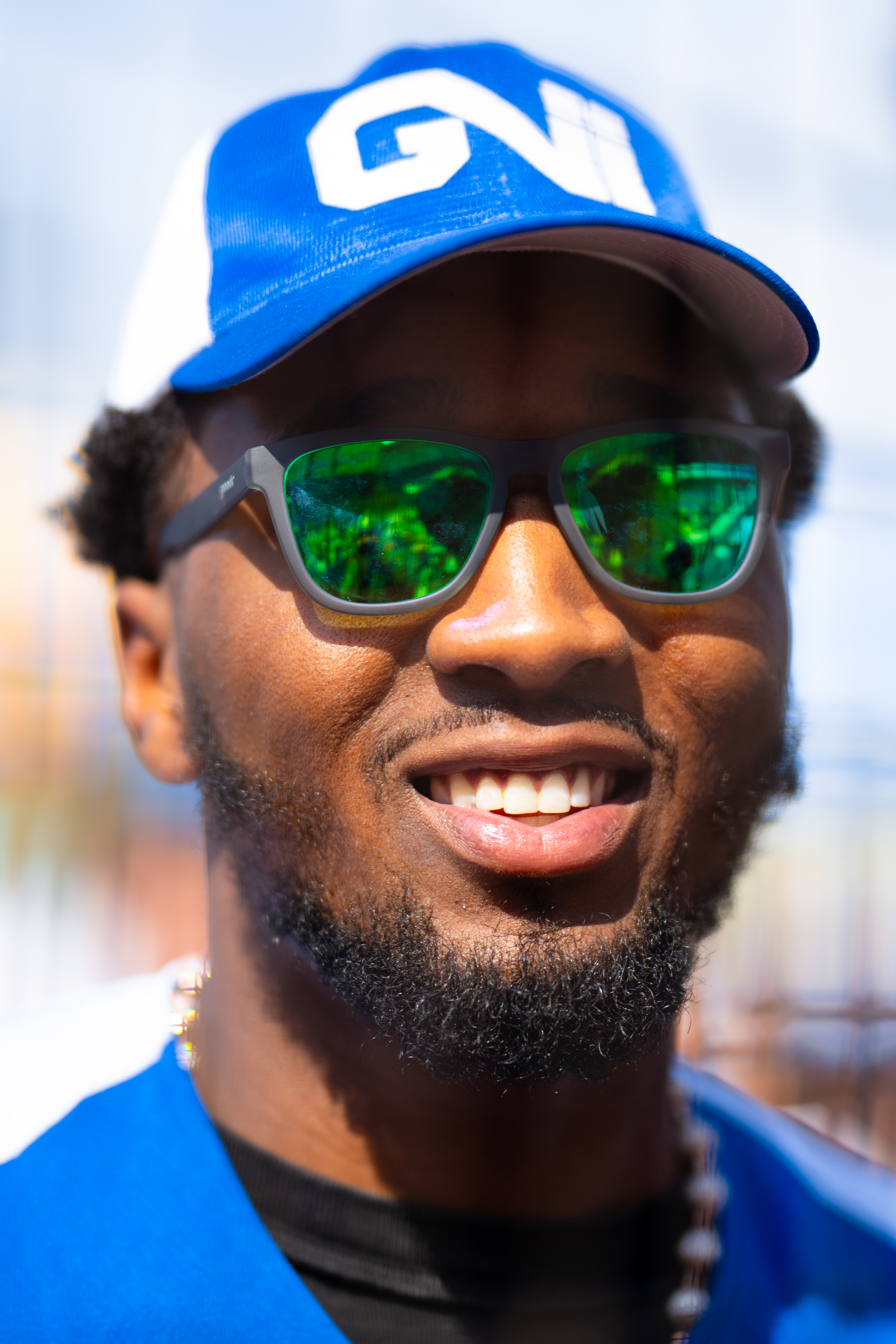
Mitchell in 2023

During the 2017–18 NBA season, Mitchell appeared on the cover of Slam and starred in a documentary called Rookie on the Rise. The docuseries follows Mitchell during his race for NBA Rookie of the Year.

Mitchell is a fan of the New York Mets and frequently attends games during the off-season. Mitchell's father, Donovan Sr., has worked for the Mets for over twenty years.

On July 11, 2025, Mitchell announced that he was now engaged to singer and actress Coco Jones. They married on August 1, 2026.

== See also ==
- List of NBA career 3-point scoring leaders
- List of NBA career playoff 3-point scoring leaders
- List of NBA single-game scoring leaders
- List of NBA single-game playoff scoring leaders
