= Elijah Hughes =

American basketball player (born 1998)

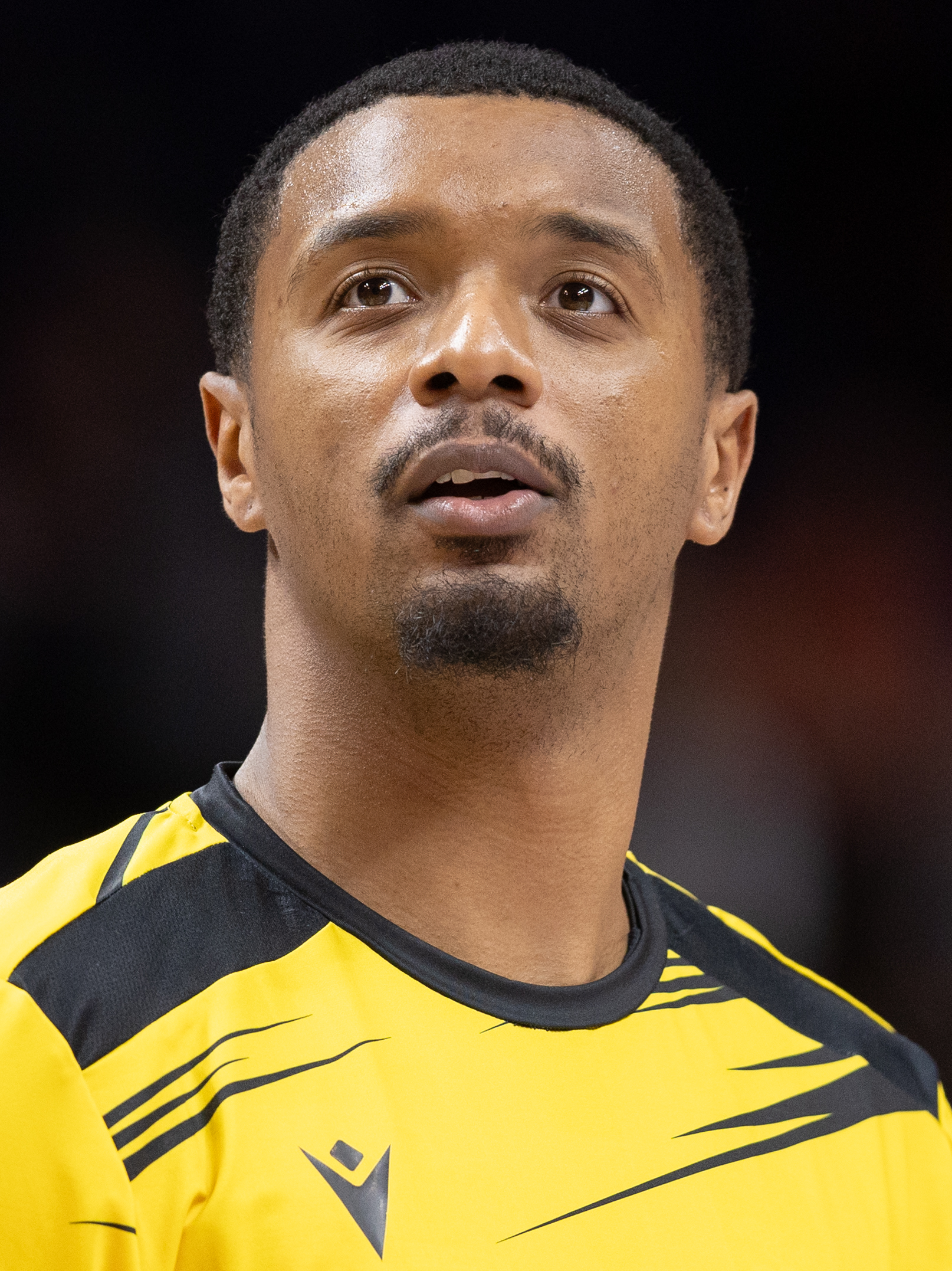
- Hughes with Ludwigsburg in 2025

No. 7 – Riesen Ludwigsburg
- Position: Small forward
- League: BBL

Personal information
- Born: March 10, 1998 (age 28) Poughkeepsie, New York, U.S.
- Listed height: 6 ft 5 in (1.96 m)
- Listed weight: 215 lb (98 kg)

Career information
- High school: Beacon (Beacon, New York); Kennedy Catholic (Somers, New York); South Kent School (South Kent, Connecticut)
- College: East Carolina (2016–2017); Syracuse (2018–2020)
- NBA draft: 2020: 2nd round, 39th overall pick
- Drafted by: New Orleans Pelicans
- Playing career: 2020–present

Career history
- 2020–2022: Utah Jazz
- 2021: →Salt Lake City Stars
- 2022: Portland Trail Blazers
- 2022–2024: Wisconsin Herd
- 2024–2025: Cleveland Charge
- 2025: CB Breogán
- 2025–2026: Riesen Ludwigsburg
- 2026: Gigantes de Carolina
- 2026–present: Riesen Ludwigsburg

Career highlights
- First-team All-ACC (2020)
- Stats at NBA.com
- Stats at Basketball Reference

Elijah Wayne Hughes (born March 10, 1998) is an American professional basketball player for Riesen Ludwigsburg of the Basketball Bundesliga (BBL). He played college basketball for the East Carolina Pirates and the Syracuse Orange.

== Early life ==
Hughes was born in Poughkeepsie, New York and grew up in Beacon, New York. He started playing basketball through the Catholic Youth Organization (CYO) and began playing on the Amateur Athletic Union (AAU) circuit for local coach, Kenney Dawson. Hughes became well-known in Beacon for his basketball ability, dominating games at Loopers Park.

== High school career ==
Following his eighth-grade basketball season, Hughes was called up to the varsity team at Beacon High School in Beacon, New York. Early in high school, he mainly played the point guard position despite his exceptional size. After two years at the school, Hughes transferred to John F. Kennedy Catholic High School in Somers, New York with hopes of receiving more exposure.

As a junior, Hughes led his team to a 26–2 record and runners-up finish at the Catholic High School Athletic Association (CHSAA) championship. Hughes was named first-team Class A All-State and CHSAA Class A most valuable player (MVP). He scored 42 points against Jamesville Dewitt High School. After the season, he committed to play college basketball for East Carolina. However, he struggled academically, in part due to the long commute and the school's competitive academic environment. To help improve his grades and meet National Collegiate Athletic Association (NCAA) requirements, Hughes transferred to South Kent School, a boarding school in South Kent, Connecticut, and later attended summer school. He became teammates with many other NCAA Division I prospects, including Tremont Waters and Myles Powell. Hughes was a three-star recruit and the No. 5 player in his state according to 247Sports.

== College career ==
Hughes began his collegiate career at East Carolina. As a freshman, he averaged 7.8 and 2.3 rebounds in 27 games, missing seven games due to injury. The Pirates finished 15–18, and Hughes gained weight due to the injury. His season-high 19 points came against South Florida on December 28, 2016. Following the end of the season, Hughes announced that he would be leaving East Carolina.

Hughes decided to transfer to Syracuse over an offer from Seton Hall. After redshirting a year due to NCAA transfer rules, during which he improved his strength and diet, Hughes was named a starter for the Orange going into his redshirt sophomore season. He was the team's second leading scorer with 13.7 points per game while also averaging 4.3 rebounds, 1.5 assists and 1.2 steals per game. He took more three-pointers than any other teammate and made 36.9 percent of them. Hughes scored a career-high 25 points in the season-ending loss to Baylor in the NCAA tournament. Entering his junior season, Hughes was named to the watch list for the Julius Erving Award, which honors the top collegiate small forward. On February 11, 2020, Hughes left a game against NC State early with a lower body injury. At the conclusion of the regular season, Hughes was selected to the First Team All-ACC. As a junior, Hughes averaged 19 points, 4.9 rebounds, and 3.4 assists per game. After the season, he declared for the 2020 NBA draft.

== Professional career ==
=== Utah Jazz (2020–2022) ===
Hughes was selected with the 39th pick in the second round of the 2020 NBA draft by the New Orleans Pelicans. His draft rights were traded to the Utah Jazz. On November 24, 2020, the Utah Jazz announced that they had signed with Hughes. He was assigned to the Salt Lake City Stars of the NBA G League on February 15, 2021.

=== Portland Trail Blazers (2022) ===
On February 9, 2022, Hughes was traded to the Portland Trail Blazers in a three-team trade.

=== Wisconsin Herd (2022–2024) ===
On November 3, 2022, Hughes was named to the opening night roster for the Wisconsin Herd.

On July 3, 2023, Hughes signed with Manisa BB of the Turkish Basketbol Süper Ligi, but on August 22, without having played a single game, he parted ways with the club for personal reasons. On October 19, he signed with the Milwaukee Bucks, but was waived two days later. Nine days later, he joined the Wisconsin Herd.

On July 9, 2024, Hughes signed with Promitheas Patras of the Greek Basket League, but never played for them.

=== Cleveland Charge (2024–2025) ===
On October 16, 2024, Hughes signed with the Cleveland Cavaliers, but was waived two days later. On October 26, he joined the Cleveland Charge.

=== CB Breogán (2025) ===
Hughes was announced as a new CB Breogán player on April 12, 2025. Signing for the Lugo-based Liga ACB team after Darrun Hilliard's departure, this was Hughes' first experience in Europe.

=== MHP Riesen Ludwigsburg (2025–2026) ===
For the 2025–26 season, Hughes signed with MHP Riesen Ludwigsburg of the German Basketball Bundesliga.

=== Gigantes de Carolina (2026) ===
On May 27, 2026, Hughes signed with the Gigantes de Carolina of the Baloncesto Superior Nacional.

=== Return to Ludwigsburg (2026–present) ===
On June 25, 2026, Hughes returned to Riesen Ludwigsburg.

== Career statistics ==
Legend
GP	Games played	GS	Games started	MPG	Minutes per game
FG%	Field goal percentage	3P%	3-point field goal percentage	FT%	Free throw percentage
RPG	Rebounds per game	APG	Assists per game	SPG	Steals per game
BPG	Blocks per game	PPG	Points per game	**Bold**	Career high

=== NBA ===
==== Regular season ====
Year	Team	GP	GS	MPG	FG%	3P%	FT%	RPG	APG	SPG	BPG	PPG
2020–21	Utah	18	0	3.6	.333	.348	.750	.5	.3	.1	.1	1.7
2021–22	Utah	14	1	8.0	**.417**	**.357**	**1.000**	1.2	.4	.3	.1	3.1
2021–22	Portland	**22**	**3**	**14.6**	.296	.224	.667	**1.9**	**.7**	**.5**	**.3**	**3.8**
Career		54	4	9.2	.328	.280	.769	1.2	.5	.3	.2	2.9

=== College ===
Year	Team	GP	GS	MPG	FG%	3P%	FT%	RPG	APG	SPG	BPG	PPG
2016–17	East Carolina	25	7	20.5	.349	.273	.684	2.3	1.3	.6	.4	7.8
2017–18	Syracuse	Redshirt										
2018–19	Syracuse	**34**	**34**	32.7	.420	**.369**	.742	4.3	1.5	**1.2**	**.8**	13.7
2019–20	Syracuse	32	32	**36.7**	**.427**	.342	**.813**	**4.9**	**3.4**	**1.2**	**.8**	**19.0**
Career		91	73	30.7	.411	.342	.763	4.0	2.1	1.0	.7	13.9

== Personal life ==
Hughes is the sixth of seven children. Hughes' father, Wayne, works for information technology company IBM. His mother, Penny, was a teacher's aide for Beacon City Schools before counseling at a methadone clinic. Hughes' older sister, Talah, played college basketball for Saint Peter's and scored over 1,000 career points.

== See also ==
- List of All-Atlantic Coast Conference men's basketball teams
