= Xavier Tillman =

American basketball player (born 1999)

- Tillman with Trabzonspor in 2026

No. 23 – Trabzonspor
- Position: Power forward / center
- League: Basketbol Süper Ligi; FIBA Champions League

Personal information
- Born: January 12, 1999 (age 27) Grand Rapids, Michigan, U.S.
- Listed height: 6 ft 8 in (2.03 m)
- Listed weight: 245 lb (111 kg)

Career information
- High school: Forest Hills Central (Grand Rapids, Michigan); Grand Rapids Christian (Grand Rapids, Michigan)
- College: Michigan State (2017–2020)
- NBA draft: 2020: 2nd round, 35th overall pick
- Drafted by: Sacramento Kings
- Playing career: 2020–present

Career history
- 2020–2024: Memphis Grizzlies
- 2022–2023: →Memphis Hustle
- 2024–2026: Boston Celtics
- 2026: Charlotte Hornets
- 2026–present: Trabzonspor

Career highlights
- NBA champion (2024); Big Ten Defensive Player of the Year (2020); Second-team All-Big Ten (2020); Big Ten Sixth Man of the Year (2019)
- Stats at NBA.com
- Stats at Basketball Reference

Xavier Justis Tillman Sr. (born January 12, 1999) is an American professional basketball player for Trabzonspor of the Turkish Basketbol Süper Ligi (BSL) and the FIBA Champions League. He played college basketball for the Michigan State Spartans. Tillman was selected with the 35 overall pick in the 2020 NBA draft by the Sacramento Kings, but was traded to the Memphis Grizzlies on draft night. After nearly four seasons with the Grizzlies, Tillman was traded to the Boston Celtics in 2024 and won his first NBA championship with the team that year in a 4–1 series against the Dallas Mavericks in the 2024 NBA Finals.

== Early life ==
In his childhood, Tillman played baseball, soccer, football and basketball, but preferred the latter two sports. He stood 6 ft 5 in (1.96 m) when he was 14 years old. Tillman played Amateur Athletic Union (AAU) basketball for the Grand Rapids Storm.

== High school career ==
In his freshman season for Forest Hills Central in Grand Rapids, Michigan, he averaged 13.9 points, 7.6 rebounds and 4.3 blocks per game, earning Associated Press Class A All-State special mention honors. As a sophomore, Tillman averaged 15.5 points and 9.7 rebounds per game and led his team to the regional semifinals with a 23–1 record. He was named Associated Press Class A All-State special mention and to the Detroit Free Press Class A All-State first team.

In the summer of 2015, Tillman announced that he was planning to transfer to Grand Rapids Christian High School in Grand Rapids, citing the lack of cultural diversity at Forest Hills Central and his own desire to "refocus" academically. His decision sparked a legal dispute between his parents, because his father supported his transfer, while his mother wanted him to remain at Forest Hills Central. In August, he was cleared to transfer but could not play in his first semester due to Michigan High School Athletic Association (MHSAA) transfer rules, with an appeal for his immediate eligibility being denied. In his junior campaign with Grand Rapids Christian, Tillman averaged 16 points, 10.4 rebounds and 2.9 assists, shooting 62 percent from the field, to help his team win conference and district titles. He earned Detroit News Class A Second-Team All-State distinction. As a senior, Tillman averaged 13.9 points, 10.9 rebounds, 5.2 assists and 4.2 blocks per game, guiding his school to a Class A state championship game appearance. He was named a finalist for the Mr. Basketball of Michigan award and collected Associated Press Class A First-Team All-State accolades.

Tillman was a consensus four-star recruit and was considered by recruiting website 247Sports as the best prospect in Michigan. On September 30, 2016, he verbally committed to play for Michigan State over Marquette and Purdue, saying, "They play the best competition, as well as they're such great guys. And it's close to home."

== College career ==
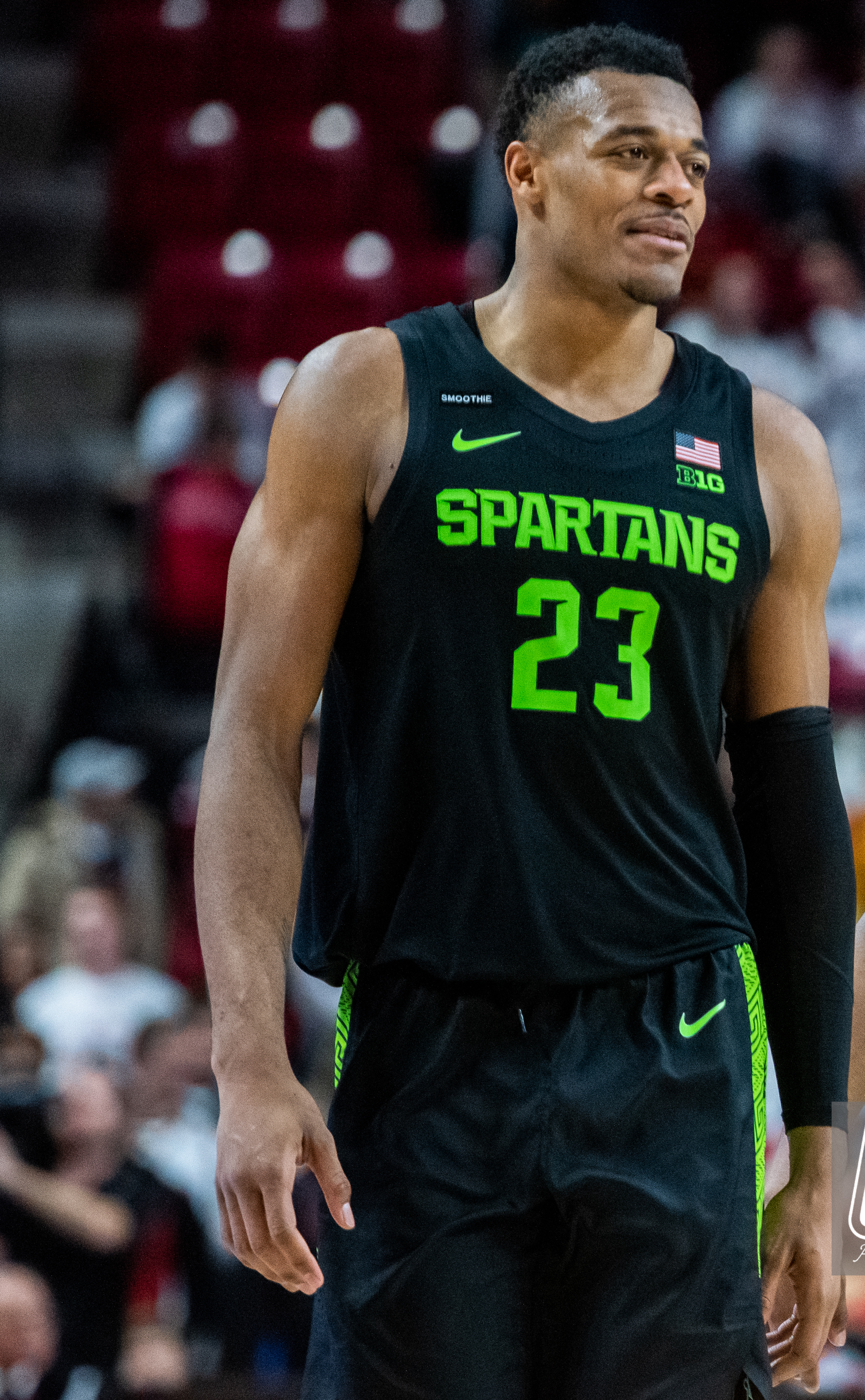
Tillman in February 2020

Tillman made his debut for Michigan State on November 10, 2017, recording four points and three rebounds in a 98–66 win over North Florida. On November 19, he posted a career-high nine points, five rebounds and three blocks in a 93–71 victory over Stony Brook. Tillman grabbed a career-best 12 rebounds on March 18, 2018, in a 55–53 loss to Syracuse in the second round of the 2018 NCAA tournament. Through 35 games, he averaged 2.8 points, 2.6 rebounds and 0.7 blocks per game. Tillman received his team's Most Improved Player award and shared its Unsung Player award. Through his first season, he lost significant weight in an effort to improve his conditioning. Tillman reduced his weight from 276 pounds (125 kg) at the start of his freshman year to under 250 pounds (113 kg) by his sophomore season.

In his third game as a sophomore, he collected his first double-double, with career highs of 11 points and 13 rebounds in an 80–59 win over Louisiana–Monroe. On January 21, 2019, Tillman posted 10 points and a career-best five blocks, the most single-game blocks by a Michigan State player since Jaren Jackson Jr. in February 2018. He posted a career-high 19 points and 10 rebounds on February 20, in a 71–60 victory over Rutgers. At the end of the regular season, Tillman was named Big Ten Conference Sixth Player of the Year. On March 31, in the Elite Eight round of the 2019 NCAA tournament, he matched his career high in scoring with 19 points and nine rebounds to help his team defeat first-seeded Duke, 68–67. Tillman guarded Zion Williamson, first overall pick in the 2019 NBA draft, for much of the game.

Tillman scored a career-high 21 points to go with 10 rebounds in a 94–46 win against Charleston Southern on November 18, 2019. He had 20 points, 11 rebounds and a career-high six blocks in a 87–69 win over Michigan on January 5, 2020. On February 11, Tillman had 17 points and 11 rebounds and made a game-winning putback dunk with 6.6 seconds left in a 70–69 victory at Illinois. On March 3, Tillman scored 23 points and had 15 rebounds in a 79–71 win against Penn State. At the close of the regular season, Tillman was named second-team All-Big Ten by the coaches and media and was the Big Ten Defensive Player of the Year. He averaged 13.7 points, 10.4 rebounds, 3.0 assists and 2.1 blocks per game as a junior. Following the season Tillman declared for the 2020 NBA draft, and ultimately opted to remain in the draft.

== Professional career ==
=== Memphis Grizzlies (2020–2024) ===
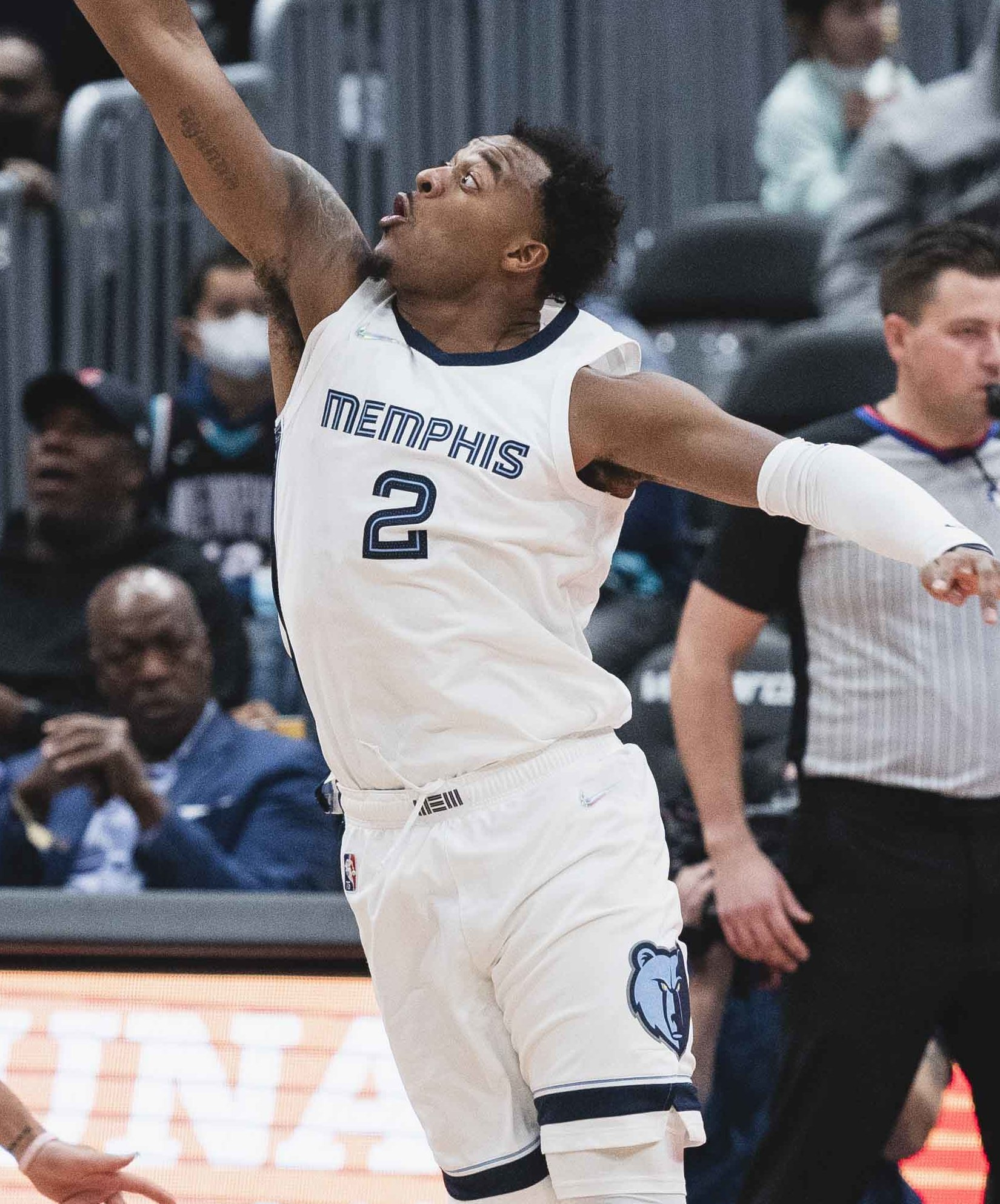
Tillman with the Memphis Grizzlies in 2021

Tillman was drafted by the Sacramento Kings with the 35th overall pick in the 2020 NBA draft. However, he was traded to the Memphis Grizzlies on draft night. On November 28, 2020, Tillman signed his rookie scale contract with the Grizzlies. On April 20, 2021, he recorded career highs of 18 points and 14 rebounds in a 137–139 double-overtime loss to the Denver Nuggets.

During the Grizzlies' second play-in tournament game, Tillman recorded eleven points, seven rebounds and three steals in a 117–112 win over the Golden State Warriors. With the win, the Grizzlies qualified for the postseason for the first time since 2017 and faced the top-seeded Utah Jazz during their first-round series. Tillman made his playoff debut on May 23, grabbing two rebounds in a 112–109 game 1 win. The Grizzlies ended up losing the series against the Jazz in five games.

On March 24, 2022, Tillman scored a season-high 16 points, alongside five rebounds, in a 133–103 win over the Indiana Pacers. The Grizzlies faced the Minnesota Timberwolves during the first round of the playoffs. On April 19, Tillman recorded 13 points and seven rebounds in a 124–96 game 2 win. The Grizzlies went on to win the series in six games, but were eliminated in six games in the second round by the eventual champions, the Golden State Warriors.

As of April 20, 2023, Tillman scored a playoff-high 22 points, he also had 13 rebounds and no turnovers in a postseason 103–93 win against the Los Angeles Lakers in game 2.

=== Boston Celtics (2024–2026) ===
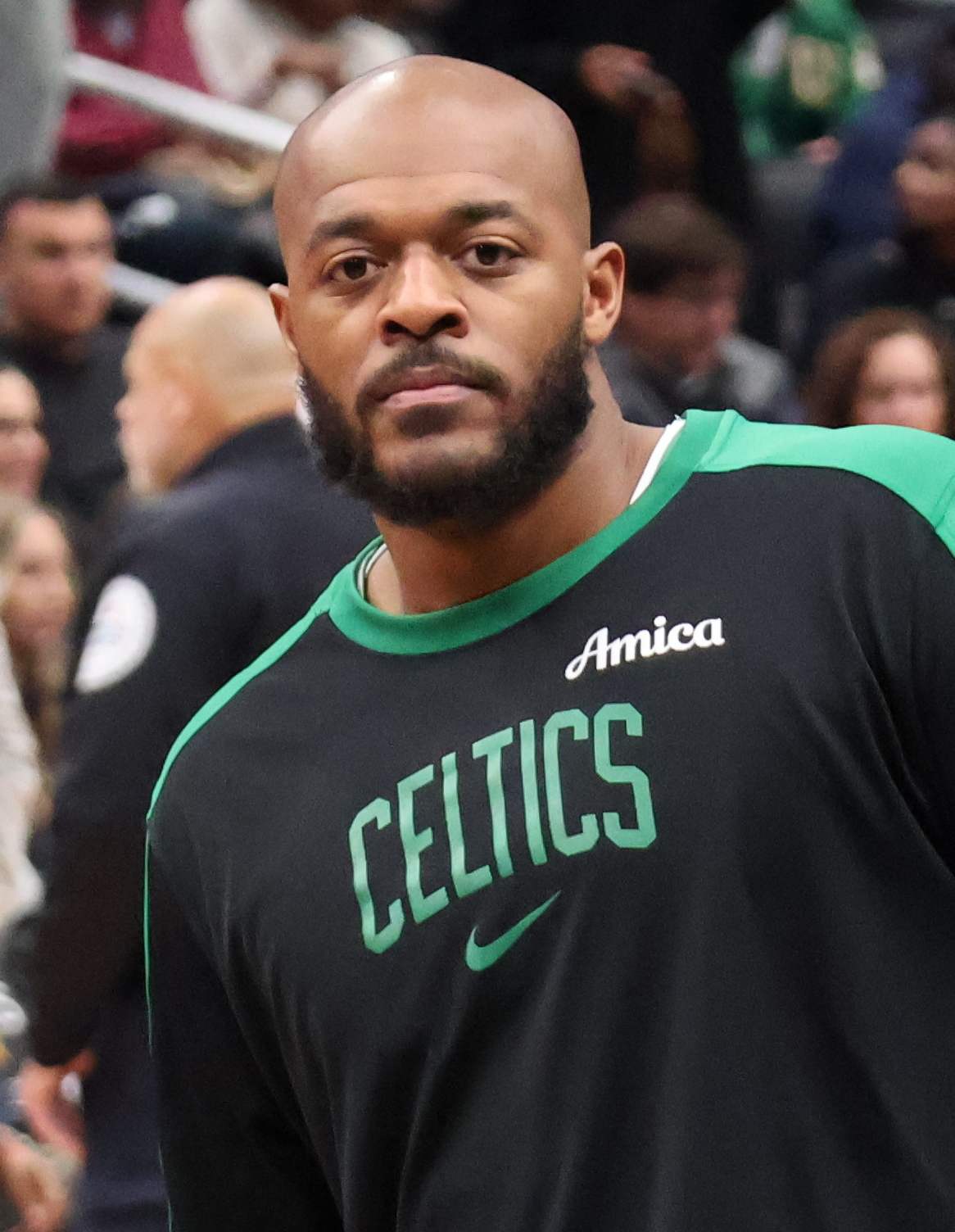
Tillman with the Boston Celtics in 2024

On February 7, 2024, Tillman was traded to the Boston Celtics in exchange for Lamar Stevens and two second-round picks. He made 20 appearances (including two starts) for Boston over the remainder of the season, averaging 4.0 points, 2.7 rebounds and 1.0 assist. Tillman ultimately went on to help the Celtics win the 2024 NBA Finals over the Dallas Mavericks.

On July 2, 2024, Tillman re-signed with the Celtics on a two-year, $4.8 million contract. He made 33 appearances (including two starts) for the Celtics during the 2024–25 NBA season, averaging 1.0 point, 1.3 rebounds and 0.2 assists. Tillman appeared in 14 games (starting one) for Boston during the 2025–26 season, recording averages of 2.2 points, 1.8 rebounds and 0.4 assists.

=== Charlotte Hornets (2026) ===
On February 5, 2026, Tillman was traded, along with cash considerations, to the Charlotte Hornets for a 2030 second round pick. He made 16 appearances for the Hornets, recording averages of 0.8 points, 1.1 rebounds and 0.5 assists.

=== Trabzonspor (2026–present) ===
On June 24, 2026, Tillman signed with Trabzonspor of the Basketbol Süper Ligi (BSL).

== Career statistics ==
Legend
GP	Games played	GS	Games started	MPG	Minutes per game
FG%	Field goal percentage	3P%	3-point field goal percentage	FT%	Free throw percentage
RPG	Rebounds per game	APG	Assists per game	SPG	Steals per game
BPG	Blocks per game	PPG	Points per game	**Bold**	Career high
†	Won an NBA championship

=== NBA ===
==== Regular season ====
Year	Team	GP	GS	MPG	FG%	3P%	FT%	RPG	APG	SPG	BPG	PPG
2020–21	Memphis	59	12	18.4	.559	**.338**	.642	4.3	1.3	.7	.6	6.6
2021–22	Memphis	53	2	13.2	.454	.204	.648	3.0	1.2	.9	.3	4.8
2022–23	Memphis	**61**	**29**	19.3	**.614**	.267	.551	**5.0**	1.6	1.0	.5	**7.0**
2023–24^{†}	Memphis	34	13	**20.6**	.408	.226	.419	4.6	**1.7**	**1.2**	**1.0**	6.0
2023–24^{†}	Boston	20	2	13.7	.515	.286	.571	2.7	1.0	.5	.5	4.0
2024–25	Boston	33	2	7.0	.245	.156	**.750**	1.3	.2	.3	.2	1.0
2025–26	Boston	14	1	7.9	.452	.200	–	1.8	.4	.4	.1	2.2
2025–26	Charlotte	16	0	4.5	.400	.000	.250	1.1	.5	.2	.2	.8
Career		290	61	15.0	.506	.246	.572	3.5	1.1	.8	.5	4.9

==== Playoffs ====
Year	Team	GP	GS	MPG	FG%	3P%	FT%	RPG	APG	SPG	BPG	PPG
2021	Memphis	3	0	5.9	.200	.000	—	1.0	0.3	0.3	0.0	0.7
2022	Memphis	**9**	**6**	15.5	.720	.500	.500	3.3	0.7	**0.7**	0.1	4.4
2023	Memphis	6	**6**	**30.5**	.533	.250	.600	**8.0**	**3.2**	**0.7**	**0.7**	**8.7**
2024†	Boston	8	0	8.6	.625	**1.000**	**1.000**	1.8	0.4	0.4	0.4	1.5
2025	Boston	1	0	8.0	.250	.000	—	3.0	0.0	0.0	0.0	2.0
Career		27	12	15.4	.573	.300	.580	3.6	1.1	0.5	0.3	4.0

=== College ===
Year	Team	GP	GS	MPG	FG%	3P%	FT%	RPG	APG	SPG	BPG	PPG
2017–18	Michigan State	35	0	8.7	**.650**	–	.656	2.6	.3	.3	.7	2.8
2018–19	Michigan State	**39**	14	24.0	.605	**.296**	**.732**	7.3	1.6	.9	1.7	10.0
2019–20	Michigan State	31	**31**	**32.1**	.550	.260	.667	**10.3**	**3.0**	**1.2**	**2.1**	**13.7**
Career		105	45	21.3	.582	.273	.695	6.6	1.6	.8	1.5	8.7

== Personal life ==
Tillman is the son of Roosevelt Tillman and Tanya Powell-May. His mother played four years of college basketball for Michigan, earning second-team All-Big Ten honors as a senior in 1990 and leaving as the program's all-time rebounding leader. His parents divorced in 2010 and shared physical and legal custody over him.

He has three older brothers, R.J., Ben and Parker, and a younger sister, Madisyn. Parker was a two-time state champion in both wrestling and rugby while attending Forest Hills Central High School and played football for Northwood University. Tillman and his wife Tamia Tillman have a daughter Ayanna Tillman, who was born in December 2016, and a son, Xavier Jr., who was born on February 17, 2020. Tillman also has another daughter, Leilani, born March 6, 2022. The family lived together in a family housing unit at Michigan State University. Michigan State head coach Tom Izzo credited Tillman's improvement as a basketball player to Ayanna.
