= Brandon Clarke =

Canadian-American basketball player (1996–2026)

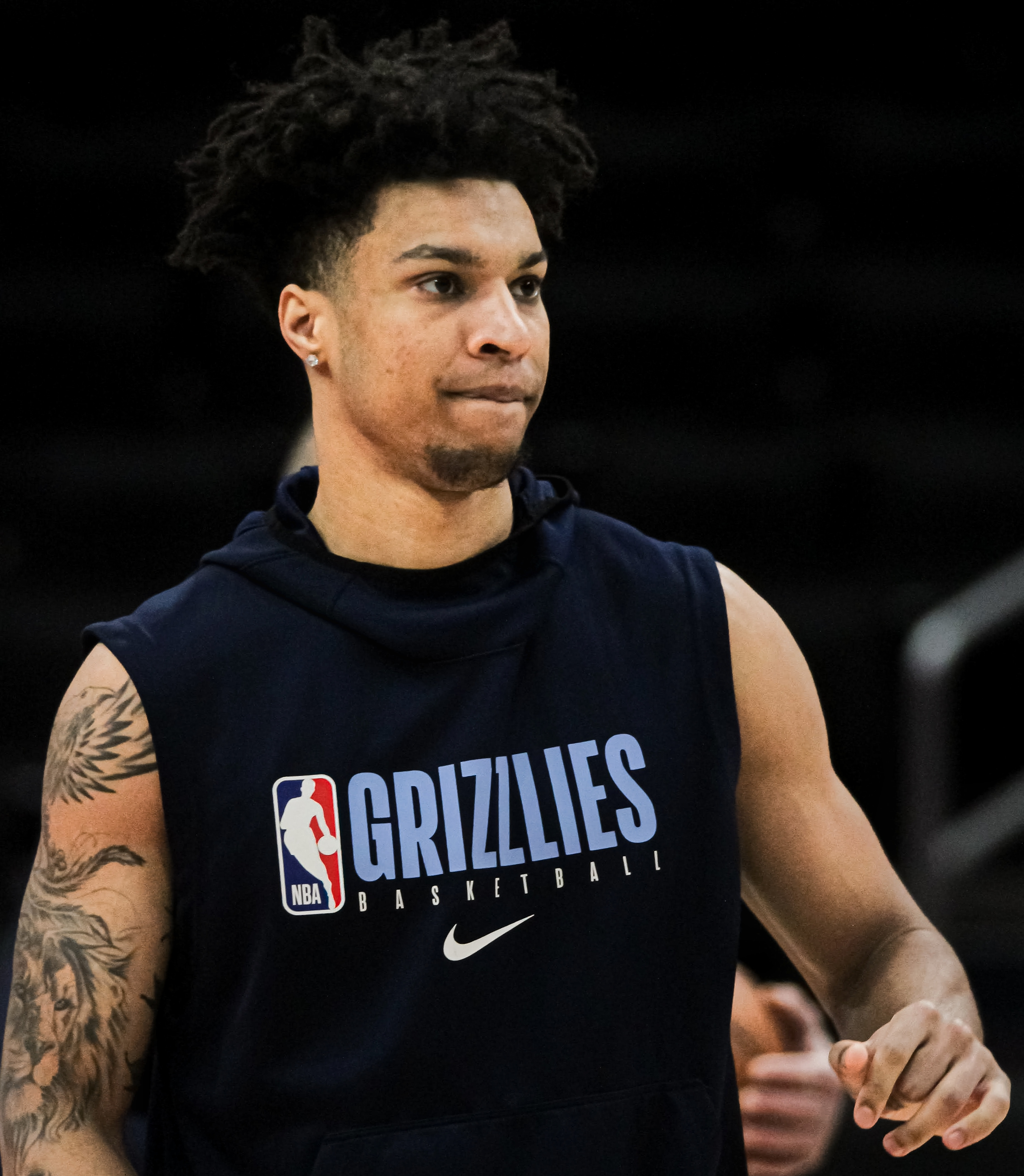
- Clarke with the Memphis Grizzlies in 2020

Personal information
- Born: September 19, 1996 Vancouver, British Columbia, Canada
- Died: May 11, 2026 (aged 29) Los Angeles, California, U.S.
- Listed height: 6 ft 8 in (2.03 m)
- Listed weight: 215 lb (98 kg)

Career information
- High school: Desert Vista (Phoenix, Arizona)
- College: San Jose State (2015–2017); Gonzaga (2018–2019)
- NBA draft: 2019: 1st round, 21st overall pick
- Drafted by: Oklahoma City Thunder
- Playing career: 2019–2026
- Position: Power forward
- Number: 15

Career history
- 2019–2026: Memphis Grizzlies

Career highlights
- NBA All-Rookie First Team (2020); Third-team All-American – AP, SN (2019); First-team All-WCC (2019); WCC Defensive Player of the Year (2019); WCC Newcomer of the Year (2019); Mountain West Sixth Man of the Year (2016); First-team All-Mountain West (2017); Mountain West All-Defensive Team (2017)

Career NBA statistics
- Points: 3,144 (10.2 ppg)
- Rebounds: 1,689 (5.5 rpg)
- Assists: 410 (1.3 apg)
- Stats at NBA.com
- Stats at Basketball Reference

Brandon Clarke (September 19, 1996 – May 11, 2026) was a Canadian–American professional basketball player who served as a power forward for the Memphis Grizzlies of the National Basketball Association (NBA). He played college basketball for the San Jose State Spartans and the Gonzaga Bulldogs. Clarke was selected by the Oklahoma City Thunder in the first round of the 2019 NBA draft with the 21st overall pick and then immediately traded to the Grizzlies. He was named to the NBA All-Rookie First Team in 2020. In June 2026, Complex Canada placed Clarke 20th in their ranking of The 20 Best Canadian Basketball Players of All Time.

== Early life ==
Brandon Clarke was born on September 19, 1996, in Vancouver, British Columbia, to a Canadian mother, Whitney Triplett, and a Jamaican father, Steve Clarke. At age three, Clarke moved with his family to the U.S. city of Phoenix, Arizona. He eventually became a dual citizen of Canada and the U.S.

Clarke attended Desert Vista High School in Phoenix. He was named an All-Arizona Division 1 honoree by the Arizona Republic after leading Desert Vista to the championship game in 2015.

== College career ==
Clarke attended San Jose State University and played two seasons of college basketball for the Spartans. As a freshman, he was named Mountain West Conference Sixth Man of the Year after averaging 10.1 points and 7.3 rebounds in conference play. As a sophomore, he averaged 17.3 points, 8.7 rebounds, 2.6 blocks and 2.3 assists on route to being named an All-Mountain West First Team and an Mountain West All-Defensive Team honoree.

After the season, he transferred to Gonzaga University to play for the Bulldogs. He redshirted the 2017–18 season. In his junior season, Clarke continued onward with his improvements and was named the West Coast Conference's (WCC) Newcomer of the Year, Defensive Player of the Year, and was named a member of the All-WCC First Team. Clarke was the first player in WCC history to win both their Newcomer of the Year and Defensive Player of the Year honors in the same season. He was also named a third-team All-American by The Sporting News. On March 23, 2019, Clarke recorded a career-high 36 points alongside eight rebounds, five blocks and three assists in an 83–71 win over No. 9 seeded Baylor. He became the third player in NCAA tournament history to record a game with at least 35 points and five blocks, joining Shaquille O'Neal and David Robinson. Clarke also broke a team record in points scored in an NCAA tournament game, breaking a record previously set by Adam Morrison.

== Professional career ==
=== Memphis Grizzlies (2019–2026) ===
Clarke was selected by the Oklahoma City Thunder in the first round of the 2019 NBA draft with the 21st overall pick. On July 7, 2019, the Memphis Grizzlies announced that they had officially acquired the rights to Clarke from the Thunder for the draft rights to Darius Bazley and a future second-round draft pick. With four double-doubles, he was named the most valuable player (MVP) of the 2019 NBA Summer League, becoming the second non-American to win the award. He had 15 points, 16 rebounds, 4 assists and 3 blocks in the championship game to lead Memphis to the league championship, and earned game MVP honors as well, becoming the first non-American to win championship MVP and the first player in Summer League history to win both honors.

On October 23, 2019, Clarke made his NBA debut, coming off the bench in a 101–120 loss to the Miami Heat with eight points, seven rebounds, an assist and a block. On December 18, he scored a career-high 27 points, alongside seven rebounds, in a 122–126 loss to the Oklahoma City Thunder. Clarke again scored 27 points, alongside six rebounds and two steals, in a 111–104 win over the Portland Trail Blazers. Clarke participated in the 2020 Rising Stars Challenge, where he had 22 points and eight rebounds. On February 25, 2020, it was announced that Clarke would be sidelined because of a right quadriceps injury. On September 15, Clarke was named to the 2019–20 NBA All-Rookie First Team.

On December 16, 2020, the Grizzlies exercised their team option on Clarke for the 2021–22 season. On January 8, 2021, he scored a season-high 21 points, alongside eight rebounds, five assists and two blocks, in a 115–110 win over the Brooklyn Nets. Clarke was named to the World Team for the 2021 Rising Stars Challenge, but the game was not played due to limitations caused by the COVID-19 pandemic. The Grizzlies qualified for the postseason for the first time since 2017 after a series of play-in tournament wins. On May 29, during the Grizzlies' first round series against the Utah Jazz, Clarke made his playoff debut, playing seven minutes and grabbing one rebound in a 111–121 game 3 loss. The Grizzlies were eliminated by the Jazz in five games.

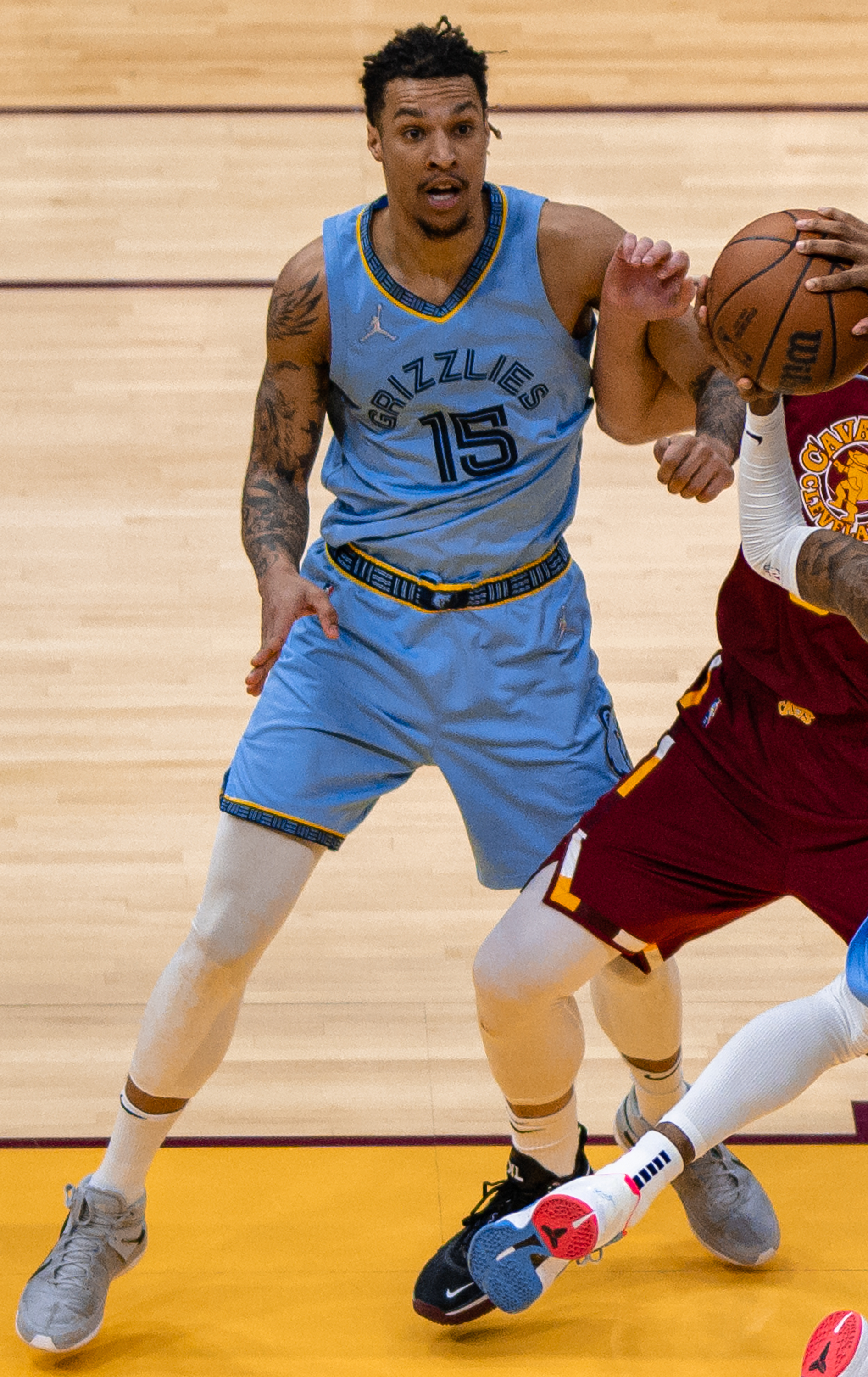
Clarke with the Grizzlies in 2022

On October 16, 2021, the Grizzlies exercised their team option on Clarke for the 2022–23 season. On January 28, 2022, Clarke scored a season-high 22 points, alongside three rebounds, in a 119–109 win over the Utah Jazz. The Grizzlies qualified for the playoffs for the second straight season, where they faced the Minnesota Timberwolves during their first round series. On April 26, Clarke recorded playoff career highs of 21 points and 15 rebounds in a 111–109 game 5 win. On April 29, he recorded 17 points, eleven rebounds, five assists and three blocks as the Grizzlies eliminated the Timberwolves from the playoffs with a 114–106 game 6 win. The Grizzlies were eventually eliminated during the second round, with the Golden State Warriors beating them in six games.

On October 16, 2022, Clarke signed a four-year, $52 million contract extension with the Grizzlies. On March 3, 2023, during a 113–97 loss to the Denver Nuggets, he suffered a left leg injury and exited the game after playing only two minutes. The next day, the Grizzlies announced that Clarke had suffered a torn left Achilles, ending his 2022–23 season.

Clarke made 64 appearances (18 starts) for the Grizzlies during the 2024–25 NBA season, averaging 8.3 points, 5.1 rebounds and 1.0 assists. On March 22, 2025, Clarke was ruled out for the remainder of the season after suffering a high-grade PCL sprain in his right knee.

On September 26, 2025, it was announced that Clarke would require an arthroscopic procedure to address knee synovitis, which was suffered during offseason training. He played in only two games for Memphis during the 2025–26 NBA season, recording averages of 4.0 points, 3.0 rebounds, and 0.5 assists. On March 24, 2026, Clarke was ruled out for the remainder of the season due to a right calf strain.

== Personal life and death ==
In 2025, Clarke started a charity, the Brandon Clarke Foundation, whose efforts included supporting ARISE2Read, a nonprofit focused on literacy and mentorship, and hosting events for youth in Memphis.

On April 1, 2026, Clarke was arrested in Cross County, Arkansas, for possession of a controlled substance (235.6 grams [8.31 oz] of kratom, a schedule 1 controlled substance in Arkansas), fleeing and exceeding the speed limit (over 100 miles per hour [160 km/h]), and trafficking a controlled substance. While he was released on a $25,000 bond, Clarke was scheduled to appear at an arraignment hearing on May 15 at the St. Francis County District Court in Forrest City, Arkansas.

Clarke died on May 11, 2026, in Los Angeles, California, at the age of 29. His cause of death was confirmed almost three months later to be an accidental overdose of cocaine, heroin, and the combined effects of multiple other presciption medications, otherwise known as speedball.

== Career statistics ==
Legend
| GP | Games played | GS | Games started | MPG | Minutes per game |
| FG% | Field goal percentage | 3P% | 3-point field goal percentage | FT% | Free throw percentage |
| RPG | Rebounds per game | APG | Assists per game | SPG | Steals per game |
| BPG | Blocks per game | PPG | Points per game | **Bold** | Career high |

=== NBA ===
==== Regular season ====
| Year | Team | GP | GS | MPG | FG% | 3P% | FT% | RPG | APG | SPG | BPG | PPG |
|---|---|---|---|---|---|---|---|---|---|---|---|---|
| 2019–20 | Memphis | 58 | 4 | 22.4 | .618 | **.359** | **.759** | **5.9** | 1.4 | .6 | .8 | **12.1** |
| 2020–21 | Memphis | 59 | 16 | **24.0** | .517 | .260 | .690 | 5.6 | **1.6** | **1.0** | .9 | 10.3 |
| 2021–22 | Memphis | **64** | 1 | 19.5 | .644 | .227 | .654 | 5.3 | 1.3 | .6 | **1.1** | 10.4 |
| 2022–23 | Memphis | 56 | 8 | 19.5 | **.656** | .167 | .723 | 5.5 | 1.3 | .6 | .7 | 10.0 |
| 2023–24 | Memphis | 6 | 1 | 22.4 | .559 | .167 | .143 | 5.3 | 1.5 | .8 | 1.0 | 11.3 |
| 2024–25 | Memphis | **64** | **18** | 18.9 | .621 | .059 | .701 | 5.1 | 1.0 | .8 | .6 | 8.3 |
| 2025–26 | Memphis | 2 | 2 | 10.0 | .333 | – | .500 | 3.0 | .5 | **1.0** | .0 | 4.0 |
| Career | | 309 | 50 | 20.8 | .605 | .266 | .697 | 5.5 | 1.3 | .7 | .8 | 10.2 |

==== Playoffs ====
| Year | Team | GP | GS | MPG | FG% | 3P% | FT% | RPG | APG | SPG | BPG | PPG |
|---|---|---|---|---|---|---|---|---|---|---|---|---|
| 2021 | Memphis | 2 | 0 | 4.5 | .500 | — | — | .5 | .0 | .0 | .5 | 1.0 |
| 2022 | Memphis | **12** | 0 | **24.7** | **.615** | .000 | .667 | **6.9** | **2.0** | **.8** | **.8** | **12.3** |
| Career | | 14 | 0 | 21.8 | .613 | .000 | .667 | 6.1 | 1.7 | .6 | .8 | 10.7 |

=== College ===
| * | Led NCAA Division I |

| Year | Team | GP | GS | MPG | FG% | 3P% | FT% | RPG | APG | SPG | BPG | PPG |
|---|---|---|---|---|---|---|---|---|---|---|---|---|
| 2015–16 | San Jose State | 31 | 3 | 23.5 | .634 | .167 | .561 | 5.6 | 1.5 | .7 | 1.2 | 8.8 |
| 2016–17 | San Jose State | 30 | 30 | **31.9** | .592 | **.333** | .572 | **8.7** | **2.3** | **1.2** | 2.6 | **17.3** |
| 2017–18 | Gonzaga | Redshirt | | | | | | | | | | |
| 2018–19 | Gonzaga | **37** | **36** | 28.1 | **.687*** | .267 | **.694** | 8.6 | 1.9 | **1.2** | **3.2** | 16.9 |
| Career | | 98 | 69 | 27.8 | .639 | .250 | .618 | 7.7 | 1.9 | 1.0 | 2.3 | 14.5 |
