= 2021–22 Memphis Grizzlies season =

- Division champions
- Head coach: Taylor Jenkins
- General manager: Jason Wexler
- Owners: Robert Pera
- Arena: FedExForum

Results
- Record: 56–26 (.683)
- Place: Division: 1st (Southwest); Conference: 2nd (Western)
- Playoff finish: Conference semifinals (lost to Warriors 2–4)
- Stats at Basketball Reference

Local media
- Television: Bally Sports South; Bally Sports Southeast
- Radio: WMFS-FM

The 2021–22 Memphis Grizzlies season was the 27th season of the franchise in the National Basketball Association (NBA) and 21st in Memphis.

On December 2, 2021, the Grizzlies defeated the Oklahoma City Thunder by an NBA record–setting 73 points, with a final score of 152–79; at one point they led by 78 points (148–70) in the final minutes of the game, but the 73-point margin is still the largest margin of victory in NBA history. The previous record was a Cleveland Cavaliers 68–point blowout win over the Miami Heat, 148–80, on December 17, 1991, that game had held the record for nearly three decades. The Grizzlies also set several other franchise records that same night, with points in one single game (152 points) and bench points scored (93 points).

The Grizzlies qualified for the playoffs for the second consecutive season after a 133–103 win over the Indiana Pacers on March 25, 2022. They also won the Southwest division title for the first time in Grizzlies' franchise history after a 112–111 win over the San Antonio Spurs on March 30, 2022. They are also the second non–Texas based franchise to win the Southwest Division title since the 2007–08 New Orleans Hornets. The Grizzlies defeated the Minnesota Timberwolves in six games the first round, winning their first playoff series since 2015. In the second round, they faced the Golden State Warriors, where they lost in six games.

== Draft ==
| Round | Pick | Player | Position | Nationality | College/Club |
|---|---|---|---|---|---|
| 1 | 17 | Trey Murphy III | Small forward | United States | Virginia |
| 2 | 51 | Brandon Boston Jr. | Shooting guard | United States | Kentucky |

The Grizzlies carried one first-round pick and one second-round pick at the onset of the draft. The 51st pick was acquired by the Grizzlies from the Mavericks as part of a Delon Wright trade from the 2019–20 season. They would select Virginia forward Trey Murphy III before later swapping him with #10 pick Ziaire Williams – who had been taken by New Orleans – as part of a three-team trade also involving Charlotte.

== Roster ==
2021–22 Memphis Grizzlies roster
Players

| Pos. | No. | Player | Height | Weight | DOB | From |
|---|---|---|---|---|---|---|
| C | 4 | Steven Adams | 6 ft 11 in (2.11 m) | 265 lb (120 kg) | 1993-07-20 | Pittsburgh |
| F/C | 7 | Santi Aldama | 6 ft 11 in (2.11 m) | 215 lb (98 kg) | 2001-01-10 | Loyola (MD) |
| G/F | 1 | Kyle Anderson | 6 ft 9 in (2.06 m) | 230 lb (104 kg) | 1993-09-20 | UCLA |
| G | 22 | Desmond Bane | 6 ft 5 in (1.96 m) | 215 lb (98 kg) | 1998-06-25 | TCU |
| G/F | 24 | Dillon Brooks | 6 ft 7 in (2.01 m) | 225 lb (102 kg) | 1996-01-22 | Oregon |
| F | 15 | Brandon Clarke | 6 ft 8 in (2.03 m) | 215 lb (98 kg) | 1996-09-19 | Gonzaga |
| G/F | 23 | Jarrett Culver | 6 ft 6 in (1.98 m) | 195 lb (88 kg) | 1999-02-20 | Texas Tech |
| F/C | 13 | Jaren, Jr. Jackson | 6 ft 11 in (2.11 m) | 242 lb (110 kg) | 1999-09-15 | Michigan State |
| G | 21 | Tyus Jones | 6 ft 0 in (1.83 m) | 196 lb (89 kg) | 1996-05-10 | Duke |
| G | 46 | John Konchar | 6 ft 5 in (1.96 m) | 210 lb (95 kg) | 1996-03-22 | Purdue Fort Wayne |
| G | 0 | De'Anthony Melton | 6 ft 2 in (1.88 m) | 200 lb (91 kg) | 1998-05-28 | USC |
| G | 12 | Ja Morant | 6 ft 3 in (1.91 m) | 174 lb (79 kg) | 1999-08-10 | Murray State |
| F | 5 | Yves Pons (TW) | 6 ft 6 in (1.98 m) | 215 lb (98 kg) | 1999-05-27 | Tennessee |
| G | 3 | Tyrell Terry (TW) | 6 ft 2 in (1.88 m) | 160 lb (73 kg) | 2000-09-28 | Stanford |
| F/C | 35 | Killian Tillie | 6 ft 9 in (2.06 m) | 220 lb (100 kg) | 1998-03-05 | Gonzaga |
| F | 2 | Xavier Tillman | 6 ft 8 in (2.03 m) | 245 lb (111 kg) | 1999-01-12 | Michigan State |
| F | 8 | Ziaire Williams | 6 ft 8 in (2.03 m) | 185 lb (84 kg) | 2001-09-12 | Stanford |

Coaches
Head coach
- Taylor Jenkins
Assistant(s)
- Blake Ahearn
- Brad Jones
- David McClure
- Scoonie Penn
- Vitaly Potapenko
- Darko Rajaković
- Sonia Raman

Legend
- (DP) Unsigned draft pick
- (FA) Free agent
- (S) Suspended
- (GL) On assignment to G League affiliate
- (TW) Two-way affiliate player
- Injured

Roster
Updated: April 3, 2022

== Standings ==
=== Division ===
| Southwest Division | W | L | PCT | GB | Home | Road | Div | GP |
|---|---|---|---|---|---|---|---|---|
| y – Memphis Grizzlies | 56 | 26 | .683 | – | 30‍–‍11 | 26‍–‍15 | 11–5 | 82 |
| x – Dallas Mavericks | 52 | 30 | .634 | 4.0 | 29‍–‍12 | 23‍–‍18 | 14–2 | 82 |
| x – New Orleans Pelicans | 36 | 46 | .439 | 20.0 | 19‍–‍22 | 17‍–‍24 | 6–10 | 82 |
| pi − San Antonio Spurs | 34 | 48 | .415 | 22.0 | 16‍–‍25 | 18‍–‍23 | 6–10 | 82 |
| Houston Rockets | 20 | 62 | .244 | 36.0 | 11‍–‍30 | 9‍–‍32 | 3–13 | 82 |

=== Conference ===
Western Conference
| # | Team | W | L | PCT | GB | GP |
|---|---|---|---|---|---|---|
| 1 | z – Phoenix Suns * | 64 | 18 | .780 | – | 82 |
| 2 | y – Memphis Grizzlies * | 56 | 26 | .683 | 8.0 | 82 |
| 3 | x – Golden State Warriors | 53 | 29 | .646 | 11.0 | 82 |
| 4 | x – Dallas Mavericks | 52 | 30 | .634 | 12.0 | 82 |
| 5 | y – Utah Jazz * | 49 | 33 | .598 | 15.0 | 82 |
| 6 | x – Denver Nuggets | 48 | 34 | .585 | 16.0 | 82 |
| 7 | x – Minnesota Timberwolves | 46 | 36 | .561 | 18.0 | 82 |
| 8 | pi – Los Angeles Clippers | 42 | 40 | .512 | 22.0 | 82 |
| 9 | x – New Orleans Pelicans | 36 | 46 | .439 | 28.0 | 82 |
| 10 | pi − San Antonio Spurs | 34 | 48 | .415 | 30.0 | 82 |
| 11 | Los Angeles Lakers | 33 | 49 | .402 | 31.0 | 82 |
| 12 | Sacramento Kings | 30 | 52 | .366 | 34.0 | 82 |
| 13 | Portland Trail Blazers | 27 | 55 | .329 | 37.0 | 82 |
| 14 | Oklahoma City Thunder | 24 | 58 | .293 | 40.0 | 82 |
| 15 | Houston Rockets | 20 | 62 | .244 | 44.0 | 82 |

== Game log ==
=== Preseason ===
2021 preseason game log
Total: 3–3 (home: 2–1; road: 1–2)
Preseason: 3–3 (home: 2–1; road: 1–2)

| Game | Date | Team | Score | High points | High rebounds | High assists | Location Attendance | Record |
|---|---|---|---|---|---|---|---|---|
| 1 | October 5 | Milwaukee | W 87–77 | Ja Morant (27) | Steven Adams (10) | Ja Morant (4) | FedExForum; N/A (Note: Spectators were in attendance, but the exact number was not reported.) | 1–0 |
| 2 | October 7 | @ Charlotte | W 128–98 | Desmond Bane (19) | Steven Adams (16) | Ja Morant (8) | Spectrum Center; 8,916 | 2–0 |
| 3 | October 9 | @ Atlanta | L 87–91 | Desmond Bane (18) | Xavier Tillman (11) | Xavier Tillman (4) | FedExForum; 11,027 | 2–1 |
| 4 | October 11 | Detroit | W 127–92 | Ja Morant (24) | Steven Adams (9) | Ja Morant (5) | FedExForum; 10,286 | 3–1 |
| 5 | October 13 | @ Indiana | L 107–109 | Sam Merrill (30) | Santi Aldama (11) | John Konchar (6) | Gainbridge Fieldhouse; 5,997 | 3–2 |
| 6 | October 15 | @ Chicago | L 105–118 | Jaren Jackson Jr. (29) | Steven Adams (9) | Desmond Bane (5) | United Center; 14,412 | 3–3 |

2021–22 season schedule

=== Regular season ===
2021–22 game log
Total: 56–26 (home: 30–11; road: 26–15)
October: 3–3 (home: 1–1; road: 2–2)

| Game | Date | Team | Score | High points | High rebounds | High assists | Location Attendance | Record |
|---|---|---|---|---|---|---|---|---|
| 1 | October 20 | Cleveland | W 132–121 | Ja Morant (37) | Steven Adams (14) | Ja Morant (6) | FedExForum; 15,975 | 1–0 |
| 2 | October 23 | @ L.A. Clippers | W 120–114 | Ja Morant (28) | Steven Adams (9) | Ja Morant (8) | Staples Center; 16,748 | 2–0 |
| 3 | October 24 | @ L.A. Lakers | L 118–121 | Ja Morant (40) | Steven Adams (16) | Ja Morant (10) | Staples Center; 18,997 | 2–1 |
| 4 | October 27 | @ Portland | L 96–116 | Desmond Bane (19) | Ja Morant (9) | Ja Morant (10) | Moda Center; 16,241 | 2–2 |
| 5 | October 28 | @ Golden State | W 104–101 (OT) | Ja Morant (30) | Kyle Anderson (9) | Ja Morant (5) | Chase Center; 18,064 | 3–2 |
| 6 | October 30 | Miami | L 103–129 | Melton, Morant (20) | Adams, Tillman Sr. (5) | Ja Morant (7) | FedExForum; 15,989 | 3–3 |

November: 8–7 (home: 6–4; road: 2–3)

| Game | Date | Team | Score | High points | High rebounds | High assists | Location Attendance | Record |
|---|---|---|---|---|---|---|---|---|
| 7 | November 1 | Denver | W 106–97 | Ja Morant (26) | Kyle Anderson (9) | Ja Morant (8) | FedExForum; 12,683 | 4–3 |
| 8 | November 3 | Denver | W 108–106 | Jaren Jackson Jr. (22) | Adams, Jackson Jr. (8) | Tyus Jones (7) | FedExForum; 12,977 | 5–3 |
| 9 | November 5 | @ Washington | L 87–115 | Jaren Jackson Jr. (13) | Jaren Jackson Jr. (9) | Anderson, Morant (4) | Capital One Arena; 16,302 | 5–4 |
| 10 | November 7 | Minnesota | W 125–118 (OT) | Ja Morant (33) | Anderson, Clarke (9) | Ja Morant (8) | FedExForum; 12,416 | 6–4 |
| 11 | November 10 | Charlotte | L 108–118 | Ja Morant (32) | Steven Adams (13) | Ja Morant (8) | FedExForum; 13,880 | 6–5 |
| 12 | November 12 | Phoenix | L 94–117 | Ja Morant (26) | Ja Morant (12) | Ja Morant (6) | FedExForum; 15,886 | 6–6 |
| 13 | November 13 | @ New Orleans | L 101–112 | Dillon Brooks (23) | Adams, Morant (9) | Ja Morant (10) | Smoothie King Center; 14,358 | 6–7 |
| 14 | November 15 | Houston | W 136–102 | Ja Morant (22) | Jaren Jackson Jr. (7) | Ja Morant (6) | FedExForum; 11,482 | 7–7 |
| 15 | November 18 | L.A. Clippers | W 120–108 | Ja Morant (28) | Steven Adams (10) | Adams, Morant (5) | FedExForum; 13,419 | 8–7 |
| 16 | November 20 | @ Minnesota | L 95–138 | Desmond Bane (21) | John Konchar (7) | Ja Morant (5) | Target Center; 17,136 | 8–8 |
| 17 | November 22 | @ Utah | W 119–118 | Ja Morant (32) | Brandon Clarke (9) | Ja Morant (7) | Vivint Arena; 18,306 | 9–8 |
| 18 | November 24 | Toronto | L 113–126 | Ja Morant (23) | Brandon Clarke (8) | Ja Morant (9) | FedExForum; 15,409 | 9–9 |
| 19 | November 26 | Atlanta | L 100–132 | John Konchar (17) | Brooks, Clarke, Jackson Jr., Konchar (5) | Brandon Clarke (4) | FedExForum; 16,622 | 9–10 |
| 20 | November 28 | Sacramento | W 128–101 | Dillon Brooks (21) | Steven Adams (12) | Tyus Jones (8) | FedExForum; 12,844 | 10–10 |
| 21 | November 30 | @ Toronto | W 98–91 | Jaren Jackson Jr. (25) | De'Anthony Melton (10) | Tyus Jones (6) | Scotiabank Arena; 19,800 | 11–10 |

December: 12–4 (home: 6–3; road: 6–1)

| Game | Date | Team | Score | High points | High rebounds | High assists | Location Attendance | Record |
|---|---|---|---|---|---|---|---|---|
| 22 | December 2 | Oklahoma City | W 152–79 | Jaren Jackson Jr. (27) | Santi Aldama (10) | Tyus Jones (9) | FedExForum; 13,103 | 12–10 |
| 23 | December 4 | @ Dallas | W 97–90 | Desmond Bane (29) | Steven Adams (13) | Tyus Jones (7) | American Airlines Center; 19,396 | 13–10 |
| 24 | December 6 | @ Miami | W 105–90 | Bane, Brooks (21) | Steven Adams (16) | Dillon Brooks (8) | FTX Arena; 19,600 | 14–10 |
| 25 | December 8 | Dallas | L 96–104 | Jaren Jackson Jr. (26) | Steven Adams (9) | Tyus Jones (8) | FedExForum; 14,025 | 14–11 |
| 26 | December 9 | L.A. Lakers | W 108–95 | Jaren Jackson Jr. (25) | Steven Adams (13) | Jones, Melton (6) | FedExForum; 16,334 | 15–11 |
| 27 | December 11 | Houston | W 113–106 | Dillon Brooks (25) | Steven Adams (9) | Tyus Jones (6) | FedExForum; 17,794 | 16–11 |
| 28 | December 13 | Philadelphia | W 126–91 | Dillon Brooks (23) | Desmond Bane (8) | Desmond Bane (6) | FedExForum; 13,420 | 17–11 |
| 29 | December 15 | @ Portland | W 113–103 | Desmond Bane (23) | Steven Adams (14) | Dillon Brooks (6) | Moda Center; 15,773 | 18–11 |
| 30 | December 17 | @ Sacramento | W 124–105 | Desmond Bane (24) | Steven Adams (12) | Kyle Anderson (6) | Golden 1 Center; 14,659 | 19–11 |
| 31 | December 19 | Portland | L 100–105 | Dillon Brooks (37) | Steven Adams (9) | Adams, Jones (5) | FedExForum; 15,977 | 19–12 |
| 32 | December 20 | Oklahoma City | L 99–102 | Dillon Brooks (19) | Steven Adams (14) | Ja Morant (8) | FedExForum; 15,721 | 19–13 |
| 33 | December 23 | @ Golden State | L 104–113 | Ja Morant (21) | De'Anthony Melton (9) | Ja Morant (6) | Chase Center; 18,064 | 19–14 |
| 34 | December 26 | @ Sacramento | W 127–102 | Desmond Bane (28) | John Konchar (14) | Ja Morant (9) | Golden 1 Center; 15,685 | 20–14 |
| 35 | December 27 | @ Phoenix | W 114–113 | Ja Morant (33) | Steven Adams (16) | Steven Adams (7) | Footprint Center; 17,071 | 21–14 |
| 36 | December 29 | L.A. Lakers | W 104–99 | Ja Morant (41) | Ja Morant (10) | Tyus Jones (7) | FedExForum; 17,794 | 22–14 |
| 37 | December 31 | San Antonio | W 118–105 | Ja Morant (30) | Steven Adams (13) | Ja Morant (8) | FedExForum; 15,412 | 23–14 |

January: 12–4 (home: 6–1; road: 6–3)

| Game | Date | Team | Score | High points | High rebounds | High assists | Location Attendance | Record |
|---|---|---|---|---|---|---|---|---|
| 38 | January 3 | @ Brooklyn | W 118–104 | Ja Morant (36) | Steven Adams (12) | Ja Morant (8) | Barclays Center; 17,089 | 24–14 |
| 39 | January 4 | @ Cleveland | W 110–106 | Ja Morant (26) | Steven Adams (11) | Desmond Bane (7) | Rocket Mortgage FieldHouse; 18,178 | 25–14 |
| 40 | January 6 | Detroit | W 118–88 | Ja Morant (22) | Steven Adams (14) | Melton, Morant (6) | FedEx Forum; 12,983 | 26–14 |
| 41 | January 8 | @ L.A. Clippers | W 123–108 | Jaren Jackson Jr. (26) | Brandon Clarke (15) | De'Anthony Melton (6) | Staples Center; 17,936 | 27–14 |
| 42 | January 9 | @ L.A. Lakers | W 127–119 | Desmond Bane (23) | Jaren Jackson Jr. (12) | Kyle Anderson (8) | Staples Center; 18,288 | 28–14 |
| 43 | January 11 | Golden State | W 116–108 | Ja Morant (29) | Jaren Jackson Jr. (11) | Ja Morant (8) | FedEx Forum; 17,794 | 29–14 |
| 44 | January 13 | Minnesota | W 116–108 | Desmond Bane (21) | John Konchar (17) | Ja Morant (9) | FedEx Forum; 15,881 | 30–14 |
| 45 | January 14 | Dallas | L 85–112 | Ja Morant (19) | Jaren Jackson Jr. (8) | Ja Morant (8) | FedEx Forum; 16,712 | 30–15 |
| 46 | January 17 | Chicago | W 119–106 | Bane, Morant (25) | Steven Adams (10) | Tyus Jones (8) | FedEx Forum; 17,794 | 31–15 |
| 47 | January 19 | @ Milwaukee | L 114–126 | Ja Morant (33) | Steven Adams (11) | Ja Morant (14) | Fiserv Forum; 17,341 | 31–16 |
| 48 | January 21 | @ Denver | W 122–118 | Ja Morant (38) | De'Anthony Melton (9) | Ja Morant (6) | Ball Arena; 17,009 | 32–16 |
| 49 | January 23 | @ Dallas | L 91–104 | Ja Morant (35) | Ja Morant (13) | Ja Morant (6) | American Airlines Center; 19,701 | 32–17 |
| 50 | January 26 | @ San Antonio | W 118–110 | Ja Morant (41) | Jaren Jackson Jr. (9) | Ja Morant (8) | AT&T Center; 14,662 | 33–17 |
| 51 | January 28 | Utah | W 119–109 | Ja Morant (30) | Ja Morant (10) | Ja Morant (10) | FedEx Forum; 16,916 | 34–17 |
| 52 | January 29 | Washington | W 115–95 | Ja Morant (34) | Steven Adams (15) | John Konchar (5) | FedEx Forum; 17,135 | 35–17 |
| 53 | January 31 | @ Philadelphia | W 122–119 (OT) | Ja Morant (37) | Steven Adams (12) | Ja Morant (5) | Wells Fargo Center; 20,424 | 35–18 |

February: 8–2 (home: 2–1; road: 6–1)

| Game | Date | Team | Score | High points | High rebounds | High assists | Location Attendance | Record |
|---|---|---|---|---|---|---|---|---|
| 54 | February 2 | @ New York | W 120–108 | Jaren Jackson Jr. (26) | Steven Adams (13) | Ja Morant (9) | Madison Square Garden; 19,812 | 36–18 |
| 55 | February 5 | @ Orlando | W 135–115 | Ja Morant (33) | Steven Adams (11) | Steven Adams (8) | Amway Center; 18,846 | 37–18 |
| 56 | February 8 | L.A. Clippers | W 135–109 | Ja Morant (30) | Jaren Jackson Jr. (11) | Ja Morant (5) | FedEx Forum; 16,101 | 38–18 |
| 57 | February 10 | @ Detroit | W 132–107 | Ja Morant (23) | Steven Adams (14) | Ja Morant (6) | Little Caesars Arena; 18,744 | 39–18 |
| 58 | February 12 | @ Charlotte | W 125–118 | Ja Morant (26) | Steven Adams (11) | Anderson, Morant (6) | Spectrum Center; 19,454 | 40–18 |
| 59 | February 15 | @ New Orleans | W 121–109 | Tyus Jones (27) | Steven Adams (13) | Tyus Jones (9) | Smoothie King Center; 15,901 | 41–18 |
| 60 | February 16 | Portland | L 119–123 | Ja Morant (44) | Brandon Clarke (10) | Ja Morant (11) | FedEx Forum; 16,834 | 41–19 |
| 61 | February 24 | @ Minnesota | L 114–119 | Jackson Jr., Williams (21) | Steven Adams (12) | De'Anthony Melton (6) | Target Center; 16,326 | 41–20 |
| 62 | February 26 | @ Chicago | W 116–110 | Ja Morant (46) | Steven Adams (21) | Adams, Bane (5) | United Center; 21,959 | 42–20 |
| 63 | February 28 | San Antonio | W 118–105 | Ja Morant (52) | Steven Adams (14) | Anderson, Bane (6) | FedEx Forum; 16,812 | 43–20 |

March: 11–3 (home: 7–0; road: 4–3)

| Game | Date | Team | Score | High points | High rebounds | High assists | Location Attendance | Record |
|---|---|---|---|---|---|---|---|---|
| 64 | March 3 | @ Boston | L 107–120 | Ja Morant (38) | Steven Adams (8) | Ja Morant (7) | TD Garden; 19,156 | 43–21 |
| 65 | March 5 | Orlando | W 124–96 | Ja Morant (25) | John Konchar (11) | Ja Morant (7) | FedEx Forum; 17,794 | 44–21 |
| 66 | March 6 | @ Houston | L 112–123 | Desmond Bane (28) | Steven Adams (12) | Jones, Morant (6) | Toyota Center; 18,055 | 44–22 |
| 67 | March 8 | New Orleans | W 132–111 | Ja Morant (24) | Ja Morant (8) | Ja Morant (8) | FedEx Forum; 16,433 | 45–22 |
| 68 | March 11 | New York | W 118–114 | Ja Morant (37) | Adams, Anderson (9) | Ja Morant (8) | FedEx Forum; 17,188 | 46–22 |
| 69 | March 13 | @ Oklahoma City | W 125–118 | Desmond Bane (21) | Steven Adams (16) | Ja Morant (10) | Paycom Center; 17,482 | 47–22 |
| 70 | March 15 | @ Indiana | W 135–102 | Desmond Bane (21) | Steven Adams (13) | Tyus Jones (10) | Gainbridge Fieldhouse; 15,027 | 48–22 |
| 71 | March 18 | @ Atlanta | L 105–120 | Ja Morant (29) | Steven Adams (11) | Ja Morant (4) | State Farm Arena; 18,062 | 48–23 |
| 72 | March 20 | @ Houston | W 122–98 | Desmond Bane (24) | Steven Adams (9) | Bane, Jones (7) | Toyota Center; 18,055 | 49–23 |
| 73 | March 23 | Brooklyn | W 132–120 | Bane, Melton (23) | Steven Adams (11) | Tyus Jones (10) | FedEx Forum; 17,794 | 50–23 |
| 74 | March 24 | Indiana | W 133–103 | Desmond Bane (30) | Steven Adams (17) | Steven Adams (6) | FedEx Forum; 16,205 | 51–23 |
| 75 | March 26 | Milwaukee | W 127–102 | De'Anthony Melton (24) | Adams, Tillman (11) | Tyus Jones (10) | FedEx Forum; 17,794 | 52–23 |
| 76 | March 28 | Golden State | W 123–95 | Desmond Bane (22) | Adams, Tillman (9) | Tyus Jones (6) | FedEx Forum; 17,011 | 53–23 |
| 77 | March 30 | @ San Antonio | W 112–111 | Tyus Jones (25) | Steven Adams (8) | Tyus Jones (6) | AT&T Center; 15,821 | 54–23 |

April: 2–3 (home: 2–1; road: 0–2)

| Game | Date | Team | Score | High points | High rebounds | High assists | Location Attendance | Record |
|---|---|---|---|---|---|---|---|---|
| 78 | April 1 | Phoenix | W 122–114 | Dillon Brooks (30) | Kyle Anderson (10) | Brooks, Tillman (7) | FedEx Forum; 17,794 | 55–23 |
| 79 | April 5 | @ Utah | L 115–121 (OT) | Jaren Jackson Jr. (28) | Steven Adams (13) | Steven Adams (8) | Vivint Arena; 18,306 | 55–24 |
| 80 | April 7 | @ Denver | L 109–122 | Desmond Bane (14) | Steven Adams (8) | Adams, Konchar (5) | Ball Arena; 19,520 | 55–25 |
| 81 | April 9 | New Orleans | W 141–114 | Dillon Brooks (23) | Steven Adams (11) | Ja Morant (9) | FedEx Forum; 17,207 | 56–25 |
| 82 | April 10 | Boston | L 110–139 | Santi Aldama (20) | John Konchar (13) | John Konchar (10) | FedEx Forum; 17,441 | 56–26 |

2021–22 season schedule

=== Playoffs ===
2021–22 game log
Total: 6–6 (home: 4–2; road: 2–4)
First Round: 4–2 (home: 2–1; road: 2–1)

| Game | Date | Team | Score | High points | High rebounds | High assists | Location Attendance | Record |
|---|---|---|---|---|---|---|---|---|
| 1 | April 16 | Minnesota | L 117–130 | Ja Morant (32) | Brandon Clarke (12) | Ja Morant (8) | FedExForum; 17,794 | 0–1 |
| 2 | April 19 | Minnesota | W 124–96 | Ja Morant (23) | Ja Morant (9) | Ja Morant (10) | FedExForum; 17,794 | 1–1 |
| 3 | April 21 | @ Minnesota | W 104–95 | Desmond Bane (26) | Ja Morant (10) | Ja Morant (10) | Target Center; 19,634 | 2–1 |
| 4 | April 23 | @ Minnesota | L 118–119 | Desmond Bane (26) | Ja Morant (10) | Ja Morant (10) | Target Center; 19,832 | 2–2 |
| 5 | April 26 | Minnesota | W 111–109 | Ja Morant (30) | Brandon Clarke (15) | Ja Morant (9) | FedExForum; 17,794 | 3–2 |
| 6 | April 29 | @ Minnesota | W 114–106 | Desmond Bane (23) | Jaren Jackson Jr. (14) | Ja Morant (11) | Target Center; 20,323 | 4–2 |

Conference Semifinals: 2–4 (home: 2–1; road: 0–3)

| Game | Date | Team | Score | High points | High rebounds | High assists | Location Attendance | Series |
|---|---|---|---|---|---|---|---|---|
| 1 | May 1 | Golden State | L 116–117 | Ja Morant (34) | Jaren Jackson Jr. (10) | Ja Morant (10) | FedExForum; 17,794 | 0–1 |
| 2 | May 3 | Golden State | W 106–101 | Ja Morant (47) | Ja Morant (8) | Ja Morant (8) | FedExForum; 17,794 | 1–1 |
| 3 | May 7 | @ Golden State | L 112–142 | Ja Morant (34) | De'Anthony Melton (4) | Ja Morant (7) | Chase Center; 18,064 | 1–2 |
| 4 | May 9 | @ Golden State | L 98–101 | Jaren Jackson Jr. (21) | Steven Adams (15) | Dillon Brooks (8) | Chase Center; 18,064 | 1–3 |
| 5 | May 11 | Golden State | W 134–95 | Jaren Jackson Jr. (21) | Steven Adams (13) | Tyus Jones (9) | FedExForum; 17,794 | 2–3 |
| 6 | May 13 | @ Golden State | L 96–110 | Dillon Brooks (30) | Steven Adams (10) | Tyus Jones (8) | Chase Center; 18,064 | 2–4 |

2021–22 season schedule

== Player statistics ==
=== Regular season ===
| Player | POS | GP | GS | MP | REB | AST | STL | BLK | PTS | MPG | RPG | APG | SPG | BPG | PPG |
|---|---|---|---|---|---|---|---|---|---|---|---|---|---|---|---|
| Jaren Jackson Jr. | PF | 78 | 78 | 2,126 | 454 | 86 | 73 | 177 | 1,272 | 27.3 | 5.8 | 1.1 | .9 | 2.3 | 16.3 |
| Desmond Bane | SG | 76 | 76 | 2,266 | 334 | 208 | 92 | 29 | 1,384 | 29.8 | 4.4 | 2.7 | 1.2 | .4 | 18.2 |
| Steven Adams | C | 76 | 75 | 1,999 | 760 | 256 | 65 | 60 | 528 | 26.3 | 10.0 | 3.4 | .9 | .8 | 6.9 |
| Tyus Jones | PG | 73 | 23 | 1,549 | 176 | 324 | 66 | 2 | 632 | 21.2 | 2.4 | 4.4 | .9 | .0 | 8.7 |
| De'Anthony Melton | SG | 73 | 15 | 1,657 | 328 | 194 | 104 | 39 | 791 | 22.7 | 4.5 | 2.7 | 1.4 | .5 | 10.8 |
| John Konchar | SG | 72 | 7 | 1,292 | 329 | 109 | 45 | 22 | 349 | 17.9 | 4.6 | 1.5 | .6 | .3 | 4.8 |
| Kyle Anderson | PF | 69 | 11 | 1,484 | 368 | 183 | 77 | 45 | 521 | 21.5 | 5.3 | 2.7 | 1.1 | .7 | 7.6 |
| Brandon Clarke | PF | 64 | 1 | 1,246 | 342 | 86 | 39 | 68 | 666 | 19.5 | 5.3 | 1.3 | .6 | 1.1 | 10.4 |
| Ziaire Williams | SF | 62 | 31 | 1,346 | 129 | 65 | 35 | 12 | 501 | 21.7 | 2.1 | 1.0 | .6 | .2 | 8.1 |
| Ja Morant | PG | 57 | 57 | 1,889 | 325 | 384 | 66 | 22 | 1,564 | 33.1 | 5.7 | 6.7 | 1.2 | .4 | 27.4 |
| Xavier Tillman | PF | 53 | 2 | 701 | 161 | 62 | 49 | 15 | 252 | 13.2 | 3.0 | 1.2 | .9 | .3 | 4.8 |
| Jarrett Culver | SG | 37 | 0 | 338 | 48 | 33 | 20 | 5 | 130 | 9.1 | 1.3 | .9 | .5 | .1 | 3.5 |
| Frank Ntilikina^{†} | C | 36 | 3 | 461 | 60 | 22 | 23 | 15 | 118 | 12.8 | 1.7 | .6 | .6 | .4 | 3.3 |
| Dillon Brooks | SF | 32 | 31 | 885 | 102 | 88 | 36 | 8 | 590 | 27.7 | 3.2 | 2.8 | 1.1 | .3 | 18.4 |
| Santi Aldama | PF | 32 | 0 | 360 | 87 | 21 | 6 | 10 | 132 | 11.3 | 2.7 | .7 | .2 | .3 | 4.1 |
| Yves Pons | SF | 12 | 0 | 71 | 12 | 1 | 1 | 4 | 13 | 5.9 | 1.0 | .1 | .1 | .3 | 1.1 |
| Sam Merrill | SG | 6 | 0 | 58 | 7 | 4 | 0 | 0 | 25 | 9.7 | 1.2 | .7 | .0 | .0 | 4.2 |
| Dakota Mathias | SG | 6 | 0 | 16 | 2 | 1 | 1 | 0 | 6 | 2.7 | .3 | .2 | .2 | .0 | 1.0 |
| DaQuan Jeffries | SG | 3 | 0 | 9 | 2 | 1 | 0 | 0 | 2 | 3.0 | .7 | .3 | .0 | .0 | .7 |
| Jon Teske | C | 3 | 0 | 8 | 2 | 1 | 1 | 0 | 0 | 2.7 | .7 | .3 | .3 | .0 | .0 |
| Shaq Buchanan | SG | 2 | 0 | 10 | 2 | 2 | 1 | 0 | 2 | 5.0 | 1.0 | 1.0 | .5 | .0 | 1.0 |
| Xavier Sneed^{†} | SF | 2 | 0 | 8 | 2 | 0 | 0 | 0 | 0 | 4.0 | 1.0 | .0 | .0 | .0 | .0 |
| Tyrell Terry | PG | 2 | 0 | 3 | 0 | 0 | 0 | 0 | 2 | 1.5 | .0 | .0 | .0 | .0 | 1.0 |

- ^{†} Denotes player spent time with another team in the season. Stats reflect time with the Grizzlies only.

=== Playoffs ===
| Player | POS | GP | GS | MP | REB | AST | STL | BLK | PTS | MPG | RPG | APG | SPG | BPG | PPG |
|---|---|---|---|---|---|---|---|---|---|---|---|---|---|---|---|
| Desmond Bane | SG | 12 | 12 | 428 | 45 | 26 | 11 | 9 | 225 | 35.7 | 3.8 | 2.2 | .9 | .8 | 18.8 |
| Jaren Jackson Jr. | PF | 12 | 12 | 332 | 81 | 11 | 9 | 30 | 185 | 27.7 | 6.8 | .9 | .8 | 2.5 | 15.4 |
| Tyus Jones | PG | 12 | 3 | 262 | 39 | 54 | 14 | 2 | 110 | 21.8 | 3.3 | 4.5 | 1.2 | .2 | 9.2 |
| Kyle Anderson | PF | 12 | 1 | 221 | 52 | 21 | 11 | 7 | 72 | 18.4 | 4.3 | 1.8 | .9 | .6 | 6.0 |
| Brandon Clarke | PF | 12 | 0 | 296 | 83 | 24 | 9 | 10 | 148 | 24.7 | 6.9 | 2.0 | .8 | .8 | 12.3 |
| Dillon Brooks | SF | 11 | 11 | 335 | 30 | 30 | 11 | 3 | 161 | 30.5 | 2.7 | 2.7 | 1.0 | .3 | 14.6 |
| Ziaire Williams | SF | 10 | 1 | 168 | 16 | 5 | 5 | 0 | 69 | 16.8 | 1.6 | .5 | .5 | .0 | 6.9 |
| De'Anthony Melton | SG | 10 | 0 | 170 | 31 | 16 | 10 | 5 | 56 | 17.0 | 3.1 | 1.6 | 1.0 | .5 | 5.6 |
| Ja Morant | PG | 9 | 9 | 338 | 72 | 88 | 18 | 4 | 244 | 37.6 | 8.0 | 9.8 | 2.0 | .4 | 27.1 |
| Xavier Tillman | PF | 9 | 6 | 139 | 30 | 6 | 6 | 1 | 40 | 15.4 | 3.3 | .7 | .7 | .1 | 4.4 |
| John Konchar | SG | 8 | 0 | 56 | 19 | 5 | 3 | 1 | 9 | 7.0 | 2.4 | .6 | .4 | .1 | 1.1 |
| Steven Adams | C | 7 | 5 | 114 | 45 | 15 | 1 | 1 | 24 | 16.3 | 6.4 | 2.1 | .1 | .1 | 3.4 |
| Jarrett Culver | SG | 3 | 0 | 22 | 7 | 1 | 2 | 0 | 7 | 7.3 | 2.3 | .3 | .7 | .0 | 2.3 |

== Transactions ==
=== Subtractions ===
| Player | Reason left | New team |
|---|---|---|
| Jontay Porter | Waived | Wisconsin Herd |
| Justise Winslow | Free agency | Los Angeles Clippers |
