= De'Anthony Melton =

American basketball player (born 1998)

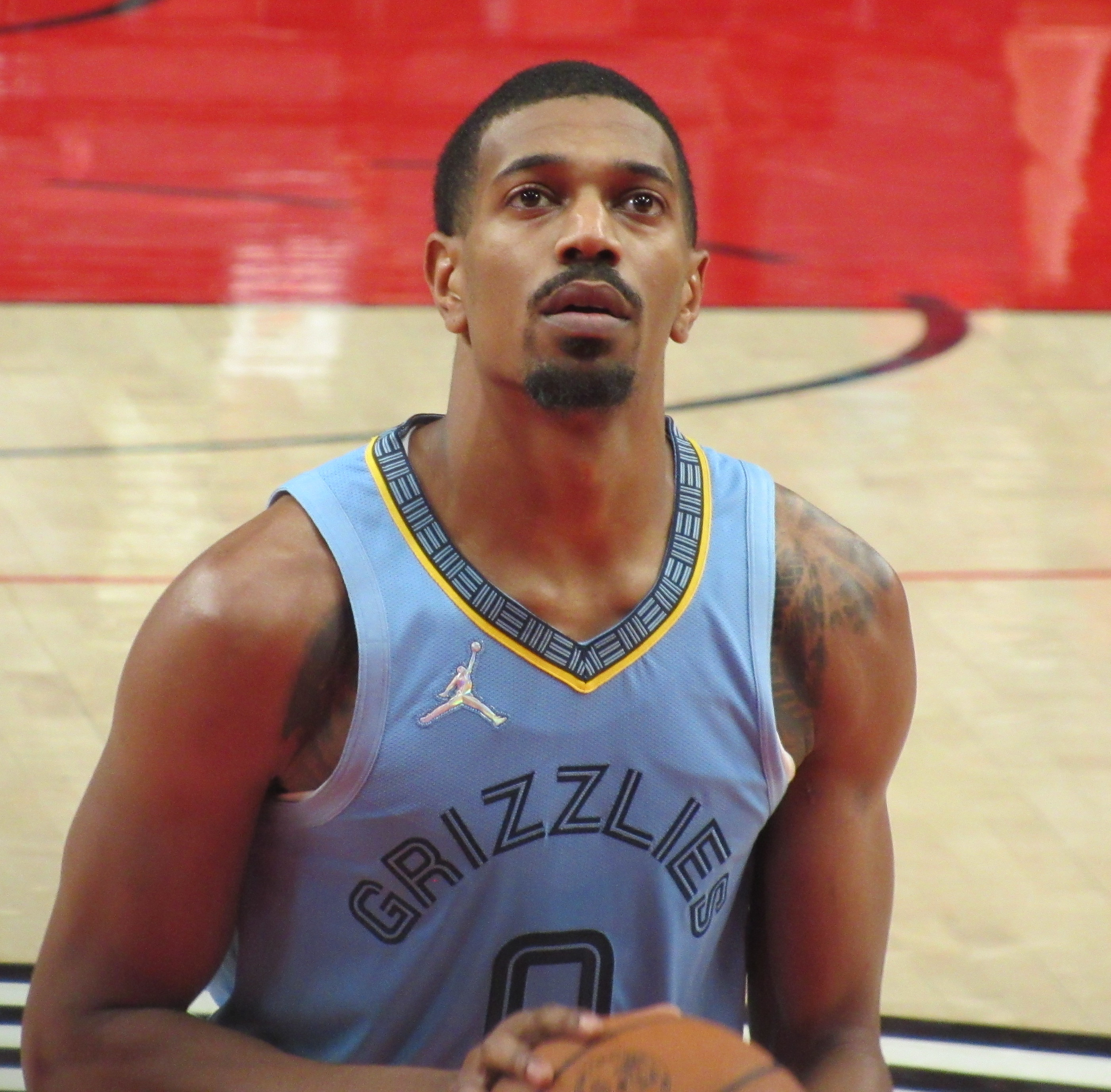
- Melton with the Memphis Grizzlies in 2021

No. 8 – Golden State Warriors
- Position: Shooting guard / point guard
- League: NBA

Personal information
- Born: May 28, 1998 (age 28) North Hollywood, California, U.S.
- Listed height: 6 ft 2 in (1.88 m)
- Listed weight: 199 lb (90 kg)

Career information
- High school: Crespi Carmelite (Encino, California)
- College: USC (2016–2017)
- NBA draft: 2018: 2nd round, 46th overall pick
- Drafted by: Houston Rockets
- Playing career: 2018–present

Career history
- 2018–2019: Phoenix Suns
- 2018–2019: →Northern Arizona Suns
- 2019–2022: Memphis Grizzlies
- 2019: →Memphis Hustle
- 2022–2024: Philadelphia 76ers
- 2024–present: Golden State Warriors

Career highlights
- Pac-12 All-Defensive Team (2017)
- Stats at NBA.com
- Stats at Basketball Reference

De'Anthony Melton (born May 28, 1998), nicknamed "Mr. Do Something", is an American professional basketball player for the Golden State Warriors of the National Basketball Association (NBA). He played college basketball for the USC Trojans of the Pac-12 Conference, but did not play in the 2017–18 season due to the events relating to the 2017–18 NCAA Division I men's basketball corruption scandal.

Melton was selected by the Houston Rockets in the second round of the 2018 NBA draft with the 46th pick, but was traded to the Phoenix Suns before his rookie season began. After a season in Phoenix, he was dealt to the Memphis Grizzlies in July 2019. Melton spent three seasons in Memphis before being traded to the Philadelphia 76ers during the 2022 off-season.

== High school career ==
Melton graduated from Crespi Carmelite High School in Encino, California in 2016, after having led his team to back-to-back state titles and leaving as the school's all-time leading scorer.

As a junior, Melton averaged 15.5 points. Melton had the game winning block in the state championship against Capital Christian High School in 2015.

As a senior, Melton averaged 20 points, 9.3 rebounds, 4.3 assists and 3.5 steals. As a three-star recruit, he committed to the USC Trojans on November 20, 2015. He was one of three finalists for Mr. Basketball as the state player of the year, was named MaxPrep All-State first team, L.A. Times All-Area and the Daily News Player of the Year.

== College career ==
=== Freshman year ===
Melton played in 36 games, starting in the last 25 games of the season that year. He averaged 8.3 points, 3.5 assists, 4.7 rebounds, and 1.9 steals per game. On January 25, in an 84–76 win over future #2 pick Lonzo Ball and UCLA, Melton had 13 points, 9 rebounds, 5 assists, 4 steals, and a block. He followed this performance with a 16-point, 7 rebound, 6 assist, 6 steal, and 2 block game against future #1 pick Markelle Fultz and Washington on February 1.

Melton became the first freshman to record at least 300 points, 150 rebounds, 100 assists, 60 steals, and 35 blocks in their starting season since Dwyane Wade. As a result of those starts, he was projected to be a key player for USC's upcoming season.

=== Sophomore year ===
On September 26, 2017, federal prosecutors in New York announced charges of fraud and corruption against 10 people involved in college basketball, including USC assistant coach Tony Bland. The charges allege that Bland and other members involved allegedly received benefits from financial advisers and others to influence student-athletes to retain their services. Following the announcement, USC indefinitely suspended Melton in relation to the scandal due to a family member's involvement there. On February 21, 2018, Melton announced he would withdraw from USC and declare for the 2018 NBA draft.

== Professional career ==
=== Phoenix Suns (2018–2019) ===
Melton was selected with the 46th pick by the Houston Rockets in the 2018 NBA draft. He played for the Rockets during the 2018 NBA Summer League in Las Vegas. In five games, Melton recorded 16.4 points, 7.2 rebounds, 4.0 assists, and 3.0 steals per game. His best game during the event was on July 9 where he made 26 points, 10 rebounds, and 5 assists in a 104–90 win over the Los Angeles Clippers. On August 31, Melton was traded alongside Ryan Anderson to the Phoenix Suns in exchange for Brandon Knight and Marquese Chriss. Melton signed with the Suns on September 21. He made his professional debut with the Suns on October 22, 2018, in a 123–103 loss to the Golden State Warriors, but did not record significant playing time until October 31 in a 120–90 loss to the San Antonio Spurs. Melton was assigned to the Northern Arizona Suns, Phoenix's development team in the NBA G League, for their first game of the season on November 3, 2018. He played the one game, a 118–108 loss to the Santa Cruz Warriors, and was recalled to Phoenix the next day.

On December 4, Melton recorded a professional high of 21 points in a 122–105 loss to the Sacramento Kings. He also recorded a season-high 10 assists in a 102–93 win over the Denver Nuggets on January 12, 2019. Melton later suffered a right ankle sprain on January 24, leaving him out of action for close to a month before returning briefly for the NBA G League on February 20, and then played in the NBA proper three days later against the Atlanta Hawks. On March 16, Melton recorded a career-high 8 rebounds in a 138–136 overtime win over the New Orleans Pelicans.

Melton was 2nd in the NBA in rookie steals in 2018–19 with 1.36 spg. When Melton was on the floor, he recorded steals more frequently than any other player in the NBA, ranking 1st with 3.3 steals per 100 possessions (min. 700 total minutes played). Among rookies to start in majority of their appearances, Melton's 3.3 steals per 100 possessions are tied for 6th most all-time in Basketball-Reference's database.

=== Memphis Grizzlies (2019–2022) ===
On July 7, 2019, the Suns traded Melton, Josh Jackson, and two second round picks to the Memphis Grizzlies in exchange for Jevon Carter and Kyle Korver. Melton made his Grizzlies debut on October 23, recording two assists in a 120–101 loss to the Miami Heat. On February 20, 2020, he scored a season-high 24 points, alongside six rebounds and three assists, in a 129–125 loss to the Sacramento Kings.

On November 22, 2020, Melton re-signed with the Grizzlies on a 4-year, $34.6 million contract. On April 19, 2021, he scored a season-high 25 points, alongside eight rebounds, six assists and five steals in a 139–137 double overtime loss to the Denver Nuggets. Melton helped the Grizzlies qualify for the playoffs for the first time since 2017, and they faced the top-seeded Utah Jazz during their first-round series. Melton made his playoff debut on May 23, 2021, recording two rebounds and two assists in a 112–109 Game 1 win. The Grizzlies ended up losing the series in five games.

On March 26, 2022, Melton scored a season-high 24 points, alongside three rebounds, two assists and three steals, in a 127–102 win over the Milwaukee Bucks. The Grizzlies qualified for the playoffs for a second straight season and faced the Minnesota Timberwolves during their first-round series. The Grizzlies were eventually eliminated by the eventual champions, the Golden State Warriors, in the second round. Melton finished 8th in the Sixth Man of the Year voting, during the 2021-22 NBA Awards voting.

=== Philadelphia 76ers (2022–2024) ===
On June 24, 2022, Melton was traded to the Philadelphia 76ers in exchange for Danny Green and the draft rights to David Roddy. Melton made his 76ers debut on October 18, scoring five points in a 126–117 loss to the Boston Celtics.

Melton finished the 2022–23 season with the 76ers averaging 10.1 points and 1.6 steals per game while shooting 39% from beyond the 3-point line.

Melton sustained a back injury during the 2023–24 season that limited his play to 38 games. Melton achieved career high averages in free-throw percentage (83.5%) and points per game (11.1), while matching his career high 1.6 steals per game from the previous season.

=== Golden State Warriors (2024–present) ===
On July 8, 2024, Melton signed with the Golden State Warriors. In six games (two starts) for the Warriors, he averaged 10.3 points, 3.3 rebounds, and 2.8 assists. On November 20, it was announced that Melton would require season-ending surgery to repair a partially-torn ACL.

On December 15, 2024, Melton was traded, alongside Reece Beekman and three unprotected second round draft picks to the Brooklyn Nets in exchange for Dennis Schröder and 2025 second round draft pick. Due to his torn ACL, Melton never appeared in a game for Brooklyn.

On October 1, 2025, Melton signed a contract with the Warriors. He made 49 appearances (including 24 starts) for Golden State during the 2025–26 season, averaging a career–high 12.3 points, 3.2 rebounds, and 2.6 assists.

On August 1, 2026, Melton re-signed with the Warriors on a two-year, $11.2 million contract.

== Career statistics ==
Legend
GP	Games played	GS	Games started	MPG	Minutes per game
FG%	Field goal percentage	3P%	3-point field goal percentage	FT%	Free throw percentage
RPG	Rebounds per game	APG	Assists per game	SPG	Steals per game
BPG	Blocks per game	PPG	Points per game	**Bold**	Career high

=== NBA ===
==== Regular season ====
Year	Team	GP	GS	MPG	FG%	3P%	FT%	RPG	APG	SPG	BPG	PPG
2018–19	Phoenix	50	31	19.7	.391	.305	.750	2.7	**3.2**	1.4	.5	5.0
2019–20	Memphis	60	8	19.5	.401	.286	.769	3.7	2.9	1.3	.3	7.6
2020–21	Memphis	52	1	20.1	**.438**	**.412**	.804	3.1	2.5	1.2	**.6**	9.1
2021–22	Memphis	73	15	22.7	.404	.374	.750	**4.5**	2.7	1.4	.5	10.8
2022–23	Philadelphia	**77**	**58**	**27.9**	.425	.390	.793	4.1	2.6	**1.6**	.5	10.1
2023–24	Philadelphia	38	33	26.9	.386	.360	**.835**	3.7	3.0	**1.6**	.4	11.1
2024–25	Golden State	6	2	20.2	.407	.371	.625	3.3	2.8	1.2	.3	10.3
2025–26	Golden State	49	24	23.0	.407	.294	.826	3.2	2.6	**1.6**	.4	**12.3**
Career		405	172	22.9	.410	.358	.789	3.6	2.7	1.4	.5	9.5

==== Playoffs ====
Year	Team	GP	GS	MPG	FG%	3P%	FT%	RPG	APG	SPG	BPG	PPG
2021	Memphis	5	0	16.7	.355	.300	.600	3.2	1.0	.2	**.8**	6.2
2022	Memphis	10	0	17.0	.323	.250	**.750**	3.1	**1.6**	1.0	.5	5.6
2023	Philadelphia	**11**	0	**24.9**	**.383**	**.388**	**.750**	**3.3**	**1.6**	**1.2**	**.8**	**7.9**
2024	Philadelphia	1	0	7.2	.000	.000	—	1.0	1.0	.0	.0	.0
Career		27	0	19.8	.352	.313	.706	3.1	1.5	.9	.7	6.4

=== College ===
Year	Team	GP	GS	MPG	FG%	3P%	FT%	RPG	APG	SPG	BPG	PPG
2016–17	USC	36	25	27.0	.437	.284	.706	4.7	3.5	1.9	1.0	8.3
