= 2021–22 Golden State Warriors season =

Professional basketball team season (won NBA championship)

- NBA champions
- Conference champions
- Head coach: Steve Kerr
- General manager: Bob Myers
- Owners: Joe Lacob; Peter Guber
- Arena: Chase Center

Results
- Record: 53–29 (.646)
- Place: Division: 2nd (Pacific); Conference: 3rd (Western)
- Playoff finish: NBA champions (defeated Celtics 4–2)
- Stats at Basketball Reference

Local media
- Television: NBC Sports Bay Area
- Radio: 95.7 The Game

The 2021–22 Golden State Warriors season was the 76th season of the franchise in the National Basketball Association (NBA), its 60th in the San Francisco Bay Area, and its third season at the Chase Center. After failing to make the playoffs the previous two seasons, the Warriors beat the Boston Celtics 4–2 in the Finals. It was the Warriors' fourth championship in eight years (2015, 2017, 2018), and seventh overall.

On December 14, Stephen Curry hit five three-pointers against the New York Knicks to reach 2,977, which surpassed Ray Allen's career total of 2,973 for most three-pointers made in NBA history in the regular season. Earlier in the season against the Chicago Bulls, Curry hit nine three-pointers to reach 3,366 which broke Allen's record of 3,358 for most three-pointers made in NBA history, regular season, and postseason combined. Curry also became the first player in NBA history to surpass 500 three-pointers in the playoffs, finishing with 561.

On January 9, Klay Thompson made his season debut against the Cleveland Cavaliers after missing the 2019–20 season with a left ACL tear, and the 2020–21 season with a right Achilles tendon tear. He recorded 17 points and 3 rebounds in a 96–82 win.

Stephen Curry, Andrew Wiggins, and Draymond Green were named to the 2022 NBA All-Star Game; however, Green was injured and did not play in the game. On February 20, Team LeBron defeated Team Durant in the All-Star Game and Curry, playing for Team LeBron, was named the All-Star Game MVP. This is the fifth time that a Warriors player has won the award. He scored 50 points, and set numerous All-Star Game records, including most three-pointers made (16), and most all-time three-pointers made in the All-Star Game (47).

The Warriors had a 41–13 record in February, then went 7–16 in an injury-plagued stretch of 23 games, and then won the final 5 games of the season. They clinched a playoff berth for the first time since 2018–19 season after a 111–107 win over the Utah Jazz on April 2. They finished third in the Western Conference, with a record of 53–29. In the first round of the playoffs, the Warriors defeated the Denver Nuggets in five games. In the second round, the Warriors upset the second-seed Memphis Grizzlies in six games. They went on to defeat the Dallas Mavericks in five games in the Conference Finals, winning the Western Conference for the seventh time in their history, and the sixth time in the last eight years. The last team to win six conference championships in eight years was the 1990–98 Chicago Bulls in the Eastern Conference. The Warriors under Steve Kerr to this point had never lost a Western Conference playoff series, going 18–0 during this span, tied with the 1959–67 Boston Celtics for the longest playoff winning streak in NBA history against their conference opponents. Golden State met the Boston Celtics in the NBA Finals in a rematch of the 1964 Finals, in which the Celtics defeated the then–San Francisco Warriors in five games. The Warriors defeated the Celtics four games to two to win their fourth championship in eight years, seventh overall, and first since 2018. After the series, many analysts claimed that the Warriors were one of the greatest dynasties in NBA history. During the championship run, the Warriors won at least one road game in all four playoff series, thus extending their NBA record for consecutives playoff series with at least one road win at 27.

== Draft ==
Round	Pick	Player	Position	Nationality	School / club team
1	7	Jonathan Kuminga	SF	(Democratic Republic of the Congo) DR Congo	NBA G League Ignite (NBA G League)
1	14	Moses Moody	SG	United States	Arkansas (Fr.)

The Warriors had two first-round picks entering the draft. The seventh pick was given from the Minnesota Timberwolves following the Andrew Wiggins trade from the 2019–20 season. Their second-round pick was conveyed to the Toronto Raptors via two other teams.

With the Warriors' first pick in the draft at #7, they would select small forward Jonathan Kuminga of the recently created NBA G League Ignite. Then, at the end of the draft lottery area, Golden State would select shooting guard Moses Moody from the University of Arkansas as the 14th pick of the draft.

== Standings ==
=== Division ===
Pacific Division	W	L	PCT	GB	Home	Road	Div	GP
z – Phoenix Suns	64	18	.780	–	32‍–‍9	32‍–‍9	10–6	82
x – Golden State Warriors	53	29	.646	11.0	31‍–‍10	22‍–‍19	12–4	82
pi – Los Angeles Clippers	42	40	.512	22.0	25‍–‍16	17‍–‍24	9–7	82
Los Angeles Lakers	33	49	.402	31.0	21‍–‍20	12‍–‍29	3–13	82
Sacramento Kings	30	52	.366	34.0	16‍–‍25	14‍–‍27	6–10	82

=== Conference ===
Western Conference
#	Team	W	L	PCT	GB	GP
1	z – Phoenix Suns *	64	18	.780	–	82
2	y – Memphis Grizzlies *	56	26	.683	8.0	82
3	x – Golden State Warriors	53	29	.646	11.0	82
4	x – Dallas Mavericks	52	30	.634	12.0	82
5	y – Utah Jazz *	49	33	.598	15.0	82
6	x – Denver Nuggets	48	34	.585	16.0	82
7	x – Minnesota Timberwolves	46	36	.561	18.0	82
8	pi – Los Angeles Clippers	42	40	.512	22.0	82
9	x – New Orleans Pelicans	36	46	.439	28.0	82
10	pi − San Antonio Spurs	34	48	.415	30.0	82
11	Los Angeles Lakers	33	49	.402	31.0	82
12	Sacramento Kings	30	52	.366	34.0	82
13	Portland Trail Blazers	27	55	.329	37.0	82
14	Oklahoma City Thunder	24	58	.293	40.0	82
15	Houston Rockets	20	62	.244	44.0	82

Notes

- z – Clinched home court advantage for the entire playoffs
- c – Clinched home court advantage for the conference playoffs
- y – Clinched division title
- x – Clinched playoff spot
- o – Eliminated from playoff contention
- * – Division leader
- pi – Play In

== Roster ==
2021–22 Golden State Warriors roster
Players

Pos.	No.	Player	Height	Weight	DOB	From
F	8	Nemanja Bjelica	6 ft 10 in (2.08 m)	234 lb (106 kg)	1988-05-09	Serbia
G	2	Chris Chiozza (TW)	5 ft 11 in (1.80 m)	175 lb (79 kg)	1995-11-25	Florida
G	30	Stephen Curry (C)	6 ft 2 in (1.88 m)	185 lb (84 kg)	1988-03-14	Davidson
F/C	23	Draymond Green (C)	6 ft 6 in (1.98 m)	230 lb (104 kg)	1990-03-04	Michigan State
G/F	9	Andre Iguodala	6 ft 6 in (1.98 m)	215 lb (98 kg)	1984-01-28	Arizona
F	00	Jonathan Kuminga	6 ft 7 in (2.01 m)	225 lb (102 kg)	2002-10-06	The Patrick School (NJ)
G/F	1	Damion Lee	6 ft 5 in (1.96 m)	210 lb (95 kg)	1992-10-21	Louisville
C	5	Kevon Looney	6 ft 9 in (2.06 m)	222 lb (101 kg)	1996-02-06	UCLA
G	4	Moses Moody	6 ft 5 in (1.96 m)	211 lb (96 kg)	2002-05-31	Arkansas
G	0	Gary Payton II	6 ft 3 in (1.91 m)	195 lb (88 kg)	1992-12-01	Oregon State
G	3	Jordan Poole	6 ft 4 in (1.93 m)	194 lb (88 kg)	1999-06-19	Michigan
F	32	Otto Porter Jr.	6 ft 8 in (2.03 m)	198 lb (90 kg)	1993-06-03	Georgetown
G	11	Klay Thompson (C)	6 ft 6 in (1.98 m)	220 lb (100 kg)	1990-02-08	Washington State
F	95	Juan Toscano-Anderson	6 ft 6 in (1.98 m)	209 lb (95 kg)	1993-04-10	Marquette
G	12	Quinndary Weatherspoon (TW)	6 ft 3 in (1.91 m)	205 lb (93 kg)	1996-09-10	Mississippi State
F	22	Andrew Wiggins	6 ft 7 in (2.01 m)	197 lb (89 kg)	1995-02-23	Kansas
C	33	James Wiseman (injured)	7 ft 1 in (2.16 m)	240 lb (109 kg)	2001-03-31	Memphis

Coaches
Head coach
- Steve Kerr
Assistant(s)
- Ron Adams
- Kenny Atkinson
- Mike Brown
- Bruce Fraser
- Jama Mahlalela
- Dejan Milojević

Legend
- (DP) Unsigned draft pick
- (FA) Free agent
- (S) Suspended
- (GL) On assignment to G League affiliate
- (TW) Two-way affiliate player
- Injured

Roster
Updated: April 25, 2022

== Game log ==
=== Preseason ===
2021 preseason game log
Total: 5–0 (Home: 3–0; Road: 2–0)
Preseason: 5–0 (home: 3–0; road: 2–0)

Game	Date	Team	Score	High points	High rebounds	High assists	Location Attendance	Record
1	October 4	@ Portland	W 121–107	Jordan Poole (30)	Andre Iguodala (6)	Nemanja Bjelica (6)	Moda Center; 13,936	1–0
2	October 6	Denver	W 118–116	Jordan Poole (17)	Otto Porter (9)	Juan Toscano-Anderson (5)	Chase Center; 16,923	2–0
3	October 8	L.A. Lakers	W 121–114	Stephen Curry (30)	Galloway, Green, Porter (6)	Draymond Green (7)	Chase Center; 18,064	3–0
4	October 12	@ L.A. Lakers	W 111–99	Jordan Poole (18)	Lee, Wiggins (9)	Andre Iguodala (5)	Staples Center; 11,526	4–0
5	October 15	Portland	W 119–97	Stephen Curry (41)	Stephen Curry (9)	Draymond Green (7)	Chase Center; 18,064	5–0

2021–22 season schedule

=== Regular season ===
2021–22 game log
Total: 53–29 (Home: 31–10; Road: 22–19)
October: 5–1 (home: 2–1; road: 3–0)

Game	Date	Team	Score	High points	High rebounds	High assists	Location Attendance	Record
1	October 19	@ L.A. Lakers	W 121–114	Stephen Curry (21)	Nemanja Bjelica (11)	Stephen Curry (10)	Staples Center; 18,997	1–0
2	October 21	L.A. Clippers	W 115–113	Stephen Curry (45)	Stephen Curry (10)	Draymond Green (7)	Chase Center; 18,064	2–0
3	October 24	@ Sacramento	W 119–107	Stephen Curry (27)	Otto Porter (9)	Stephen Curry (10)	Golden 1 Center; 13,876	3–0
4	October 26	@ Oklahoma City	W 106–98	Stephen Curry (23)	Draymond Green (9)	Draymond Green (8)	Paycom Center; 15,717	4–0
5	October 28	Memphis	L 101–104 (OT)	Stephen Curry (36)	Draymond Green (12)	Stephen Curry (8)	Chase Center; 18,064	4–1
6	October 30	Oklahoma City	W 103–82	Stephen Curry (20)	Draymond Green (11)	Draymond Green (8)	Chase Center; 18,064	5–1

November: 13–2 (home: 9–0; road: 4–2)

Game	Date	Team	Score	High points	High rebounds	High assists	Location Attendance	Record
7	November 3	Charlotte	W 114–92	Jordan Poole (31)	Draymond Green (10)	Stephen Curry (9)	Chase Center; 18,064	6–1
8	November 5	New Orleans	W 126–85	Jordan Poole (26)	Draymond Green (8)	Andre Iguodala (10)	Chase Center; 18,064	7–1
9	November 7	Houston	W 120–107	Jordan Poole (25)	Otto Porter (9)	Draymond Green (9)	Chase Center; 18,064	8–1
10	November 8	Atlanta	W 127–113	Stephen Curry (50)	Curry, Green (7)	Stephen Curry (10)	Chase Center; 18,064	9–1
11	November 10	Minnesota	W 123–110	Andrew Wiggins (35)	Kevon Looney (17)	Andre Iguodala (8)	Chase Center; 18,064	10–1
12	November 12	Chicago	W 119–93	Stephen Curry (40)	Kevon Looney (10)	Draymond Green (7)	Chase Center; 18,064	11–1
13	November 14	@ Charlotte	L 102–106	Andrew Wiggins (28)	Kevon Looney (8)	Stephen Curry (10)	Spectrum Center; 19,559	11–2
14	November 16	@ Brooklyn	W 117–99	Stephen Curry (37)	Stephen Curry (7)	Draymond Green (8)	Barclays Center; 17,732	12–2
15	November 18	@ Cleveland	W 104–89	Stephen Curry (40)	Lee, Payton II (6)	Draymond Green (14)	Rocket Mortgage FieldHouse; 19,432	13–2
16	November 19	@ Detroit	W 105–102	Jordan Poole (32)	Kevon Looney (12)	Juan Toscano-Anderson (9)	Little Caesars Arena; 20,088	14–2
17	November 21	Toronto	W 119–104	Jordan Poole (33)	Draymond Green (14)	Curry, Green (8)	Chase Center; 18,064	15–2
18	November 24	Philadelphia	W 116–96	Stephen Curry (25)	Draymond Green (9)	Stephen Curry (10)	Chase Center; 18,064	16–2
19	November 26	Portland	W 118–103	Stephen Curry (32)	Green, Toscano-Anderson (8)	Draymond Green (12)	Chase Center; 18,064	17–2
20	November 28	@ L.A. Clippers	W 105–90	Stephen Curry (33)	Otto Porter (10)	Draymond Green (7)	Staples Center; 19,068	18–2
21	November 30	@ Phoenix	L 96–104	Jordan Poole (28)	Draymond Green (11)	Draymond Green (5)	Footprint Center; 17,071	18–3

December: 9–4 (home: 5–2; road: 4–2)

Game	Date	Team	Score	High points	High rebounds	High assists	Location Attendance	Record
22	December 3	Phoenix	W 118–96	Stephen Curry (23)	Draymond Green (9)	Draymond Green (9)	Chase Center; 18,064	19–3
23	December 4	San Antonio	L 107–112	Stephen Curry (27)	Curry, Green (8)	Draymond Green (9)	Chase Center; 18,064	19–4
24	December 6	Orlando	W 126–95	Stephen Curry (31)	Green, Poole (7)	Stephen Curry (8)	Chase Center; 18,064	20–4
25	December 8	Portland	W 104–94	Stephen Curry (22)	Draymond Green (10)	Draymond Green (8)	Chase Center; 18,064	21–4
26	December 11	@ Philadelphia	L 93–102	Jordan Poole (23)	Stephen Curry (9)	Stephen Curry (5)	Wells Fargo Center; 21,016	21–5
27	December 13	@ Indiana	W 102–100	Stephen Curry (26)	Draymond Green (9)	Stephen Curry (6)	Bankers Life Fieldhouse; 17,018	22–5
28	December 14	@ New York	W 105–96	Stephen Curry (22)	Draymond Green (11)	Draymond Green (7)	Madison Square Garden; 19,812	23–5
29	December 17	@ Boston	W 111–107	Stephen Curry (30)	Kevon Looney (10)	Draymond Green (8)	TD Garden; 19,156	24–5
30	December 18	@ Toronto	L 100–119	Jonathan Kuminga (26)	Juan Toscano-Anderson (10)	Chris Chiozza (7)	Scotiabank Arena; 7,988	24–6
31	December 20	Sacramento	W 113–98	Stephen Curry (30)	Draymond Green (11)	Draymond Green (10)	Chase Center; 18,064	25–6
32	December 23	Memphis	W 113–104	Stephen Curry (46)	Otto Porter (9)	Draymond Green (9)	Chase Center; 18,064	26–6
33	December 25	@ Phoenix	W 116–107	Stephen Curry (33)	Kevon Looney (10)	Draymond Green (10)	Footprint Center; 17,071	27–6
34	December 28	Denver	L 86–89	Stephen Curry (23)	Bjelica, Wiggins (8)	Curry, Iguodala (4)	Chase Center; 18,064	27–7
–	December 30	@ Denver	Postponed (Coronavirus) (Makeup date: March 7)					

January: 11–6 (home: 8–1; road: 3–5)

Game	Date	Team	Score	High points	High rebounds	High assists	Location Attendance	Record
35	January 1	@ Utah	W 123–116	Stephen Curry (28)	Iguodala, Looney, Porter (7)	Stephen Curry (9)	Vivint Arena; 18,306	28–7
36	January 3	Miami	W 115–108	Jordan Poole (32)	Draymond Green (8)	Draymond Green (13)	Chase Center; 18,064	29–7
37	January 5	@ Dallas	L 82–99	Andrew Wiggins (17)	Gary Payton II (11)	Stephen Curry (5)	American Airlines Center; 20,441	29–8
38	January 6	@ New Orleans	L 96–101	Andrew Wiggins (21)	Kevon Looney (9)	Andre Iguodala (7)	Smoothie King Center; 15,986	29–9
39	January 9	Cleveland	W 96–82	Stephen Curry (28)	Kevon Looney (18)	Curry, Iguodala (5)	Chase Center; 18,064	30–9
40	January 11	@ Memphis	L 108–116	Stephen Curry (27)	Stephen Curry (10)	Stephen Curry (10)	FedExForum; 17,794	30–10
41	January 13	@ Milwaukee	L 99–118	Andrew Wiggins (16)	Stephen Curry (8)	Stephen Curry (5)	Fiserv Forum; 17,848	30–11
42	January 14	@ Chicago	W 138–96	Jonathan Kuminga (25)	Kevon Looney (12)	Nemanja Bjelica (7)	United Center; 21,174	31–11
43	January 16	@ Minnesota	L 99–119	Jordan Poole (20)	Kevon Looney (12)	Porter, Wiggins (4)	Target Center; 17,136	31–12
44	January 18	Detroit	W 102–86	Klay Thompson (21)	Kuminga, Looney (10)	Stephen Curry (8)	Chase Center; 18,064	32–12
45	January 20	Indiana	L 117–121 (OT)	Stephen Curry (39)	Kevon Looney (15)	Stephen Curry (8)	Chase Center; 18,064	32–13
46	January 21	Houston	W 105–103	Stephen Curry (22)	Kevon Looney (12)	Stephen Curry (12)	Chase Center; 18,064	33–13
47	January 23	Utah	W 94–92	Jordan Poole (20)	Otto Porter (8)	Stephen Curry (6)	Chase Center; 18,064	34–13
48	January 25	Dallas	W 130–92	Jonathan Kuminga (22)	Nemanja Bjelica (10)	Stephen Curry (7)	Chase Center; 18,064	35–13
49	January 27	Minnesota	W 124–115	Stephen Curry (29)	Curry, Payton II (5)	Bjelica, Curry (6)	Chase Center; 18,064	36–13
50	January 29	Brooklyn	W 110–106	Andrew Wiggins (24)	Kevon Looney (15)	Stephen Curry (8)	Chase Center; 18,064	37–13
51	January 31	@ Houston	W 122–108	Stephen Curry (40)	Kevon Looney (14)	Stephen Curry (9)	Toyota Center; 16,146	38–13

February: 5–5 (home: 2–3; road: 3–2)

Game	Date	Team	Score	High points	High rebounds	High assists	Location Attendance	Record
52	February 1	@ San Antonio	W 124–120	Jordan Poole (31)	Kevon Looney (12)	Juan Toscano-Anderson (7)	AT&T Center; 17,070	39–13
53	February 3	Sacramento	W 126–114	Klay Thompson (23)	Kuminga, Looney (7)	Curry, Thompson (7)	Chase Center; 18,064	40–13
54	February 7	@ Oklahoma City	W 110–98	Klay Thompson (21)	Stephen Curry (9)	Stephen Curry (10)	Paycom Center; 17,009	41–13
55	February 9	@ Utah	L 85–111	Jordan Poole (18)	Curry, Looney (7)	Andrew Wiggins (4)	Vivint Arena; 18,306	41–14
56	February 10	New York	L 114–116	Stephen Curry (35)	Thompson, Wiggins (7)	Stephen Curry (10)	Chase Center; 18,064	41–15
57	February 12	L.A. Lakers	W 117–115	Klay Thompson (33)	Kevon Looney (12)	Stephen Curry (8)	Chase Center; 18,064	42–15
58	February 14	@ L.A. Clippers	L 104–119	Stephen Curry (33)	Otto Porter (8)	Kevon Looney (5)	Crypto.com Arena; 19,068	42–16
59	February 16	Denver	L 116–117	Stephen Curry (25)	Kevon Looney (9)	Stephen Curry (6)	Chase Center; 18,064	42–17
60	February 24	@ Portland	W 132–95	Curry, Thompson (18)	Jonathan Kuminga (8)	Stephen Curry (14)	Moda Center; 20,098	43–17
61	February 27	Dallas	L 101–107	Stephen Curry (27)	Kevon Looney (10)	Stephen Curry (10)	Chase Center; 18,064	43–18

March: 5–11 (home: 3–3; road: 2–8)

Game	Date	Team	Score	High points	High rebounds	High assists	Location Attendance	Record
62	March 1	@ Minnesota	L 114–129	Stephen Curry (34)	Looney, Wiggins (7)	Kevon Looney (5)	Target Center; 17,136	43–19
63	March 3	@ Dallas	L 113–122	Jordan Poole (23)	Kevon Looney (9)	Stephen Curry (9)	American Airlines Center; 20,229	43–20
64	March 5	@ L.A. Lakers	L 116–124	Stephen Curry (30)	Otto Porter (10)	Poole, Toscano-Anderson (5)	Crypto.com Arena; 18,997	43–21
65	March 7	@ Denver	L 124–131	Jordan Poole (32)	Kevon Looney (11)	Chris Chiozza (8)	Ball Arena; 19,542	43–22
66	March 8	L.A. Clippers	W 112–97	Jonathan Kuminga (21)	Andrew Wiggins (11)	Kuminga, Looney (6)	Chase Center; 18,064	44–22
67	March 10	@ Denver	W 113–102	Stephen Curry (34)	Stephen Curry (9)	Jordan Poole (7)	Ball Arena; 19,520	45–22
68	March 12	Milwaukee	W 122–109	Klay Thompson (38)	Jonathan Kuminga (11)	Stephen Curry (8)	Chase Center; 18,064	46–22
69	March 14	Washington	W 126–112	Stephen Curry (47)	Jonathan Kuminga (8)	Curry, Green (6)	Chase Center; 18,064	47–22
70	March 16	Boston	L 88–110	Jordan Poole (29)	Green, Looney (8)	Kevon Looney (4)	Chase Center; 18,064	47–23
71	March 20	San Antonio	L 108–110	Jordan Poole (28)	Otto Porter (16)	Nemanja Bjelica (6)	Chase Center; 18,064	47–24
72	March 22	@ Orlando	L 90–94	Jordan Poole (26)	Otto Porter (15)	Draymond Green (7)	Amway Center; 17,164	47–25
73	March 23	@ Miami	W 118–104	Jordan Poole (30)	Kevon Looney (16)	Jordan Poole (9)	FTX Arena; 19,600	48–25
74	March 25	@ Atlanta	L 110–121	Klay Thompson (37)	Kevon Looney (8)	Jordan Poole (10)	State Farm Arena; 17,724	48–26
75	March 27	@ Washington	L 115–123	Jordan Poole (26)	Otto Porter (11)	Draymond Green (6)	Capital One Arena; 24,760	48–27
76	March 28	@ Memphis	L 95–123	Jordan Poole (25)	Jonathan Kuminga (7)	Jonathan Kuminga (4)	FedExForum; 17,011	48–28
77	March 30	Phoenix	L 103–107	Jordan Poole (38)	Draymond Green (10)	Green, Poole (7)	Chase Center; 18,064	48–29

April: 5–0 (home: 2–0; road: 3–0)

Game	Date	Team	Score	High points	High rebounds	High assists	Location Attendance	Record
78	April 2	Utah	W 111–107	Klay Thompson (36)	Draymond Green (9)	Draymond Green (7)	Chase Center; 18,064	49–29
79	April 3	@ Sacramento	W 109–90	Andrew Wiggins (25)	Nemanja Bjelica (12)	Nemanja Bjelica (6)	Golden 1 Center; 17,583	50–29
80	April 7	L.A. Lakers	W 128–112	Klay Thompson (33)	Otto Porter Jr. (8)	Jordan Poole (11)	Chase Center; 18,064	51–29
81	April 9	@ San Antonio	W 100–94	Poole, Kuminga (18)	Draymond Green (13)	Green, Poole (8)	AT&T Center; 18,627	52–29
82	April 10	@ New Orleans	W 128–107	Klay Thompson (41)	Nemanja Bjelica (7)	Nemanja Bjelica (7)	Smoothie King Center; 16,595	53–29

2021–22 season schedule

=== Playoffs ===
2022 playoff game log
Total: 16–6 (Home: 11–1; Road: 5–5)
First Round: 4–1 (home: 3–0; road: 1–1)

Game	Date	Team	Score	High points	High rebounds	High assists	Location Attendance	Series
1	April 16	Denver	W 123–107	Jordan Poole (30)	Andrew Wiggins (9)	Draymond Green (9)	Chase Center; 18,064	1–0
2	April 18	Denver	W 126–106	Stephen Curry (34)	Andrew Wiggins (8)	Jordan Poole (8)	Chase Center; 18,064	2–0
3	April 21	@ Denver	W 118–113	Poole, Curry (27)	Andrew Wiggins (6)	Draymond Green (10)	Ball Arena; 19,627	3–0
4	April 24	@ Denver	L 121–126	Stephen Curry (33)	Draymond Green (11)	Jordan Poole (9)	Ball Arena; 19,628	3–1
5	April 27	Denver	W 102–98	Stephen Curry (30)	Klay Thompson (9)	Draymond Green (6)	Chase Center; 18,064	4–1

Conference Semifinals: 4–2 (home: 3–0; road: 1–2)

Game	Date	Team	Score	High points	High rebounds	High assists	Location Attendance	Series
1	May 1	@ Memphis	W 117–116	Jordan Poole (31)	Poole, Wiggins, Porter (8)	Jordan Poole (9)	FedExForum; 17,794	1–0
2	May 3	@ Memphis	L 101–106	Stephen Curry (27)	Draymond Green (10)	Stephen Curry (8)	FedExForum; 17,794	1–1
3	May 7	Memphis	W 142–112	Stephen Curry (30)	Klay Thompson (9)	Draymond Green (8)	Chase Center; 18,064	2–1
4	May 9	Memphis	W 101–98	Stephen Curry (32)	Draymond Green (11)	Stephen Curry (8)	Chase Center; 18,064	3–1
5	May 11	@ Memphis	L 95–134	Klay Thompson (19)	Draymond Green (7)	Draymond Green (5)	FedExForum; 17,794	3–2
6	May 13	Memphis	W 110–96	Klay Thompson (30)	Kevon Looney (22)	Draymond Green (8)	Chase Center; 18,064	4–2

Conference Finals: 4–1 (home: 3–0; road: 1–1)

Game	Date	Team	Score	High points	High rebounds	High assists	Location Attendance	Series
1	May 18	Dallas	W 112–87	Stephen Curry (21)	Stephen Curry (12)	Stephen Curry (4)	Chase Center; 18,064	1–0
2	May 20	Dallas	W 126–117	Stephen Curry (32)	Kevon Looney (12)	5 players each	Chase Center; 18,064	2–0
3	May 22	@ Dallas	W 109–100	Stephen Curry (31)	Kevon Looney (12)	Stephen Curry (11)	American Airlines Center; 20,813	3–0
4	May 24	@ Dallas	L 109–119	Stephen Curry (20)	Jonathan Kuminga (8)	Stephen Curry (8)	American Airlines Center; 20,810	3–1
5	May 26	Dallas	W 120–110	Klay Thompson (32)	Kevon Looney (18)	Draymond Green (9)	Chase Center; 18,064	4–1

NBA Finals: 4–2 (home: 2–1; road: 2–1)

Game	Date	Team	Score	High points	High rebounds	High assists	Location Attendance	Series
1	June 2	Boston	L 108–120	Stephen Curry (34)	Draymond Green (11)	Stephen Curry (5)	Chase Center; 18,064	0–1
2	June 5	Boston	W 107–88	Stephen Curry (29)	Kevon Looney (7)	Draymond Green (7)	Chase Center; 18,064	1–1
3	June 8	@ Boston	L 100–116	Stephen Curry (31)	Looney, Wiggins (7)	Otto Porter Jr. (4)	TD Garden; 19,156	1–2
4	June 10	@ Boston	W 107–97	Stephen Curry (43)	Andrew Wiggins (16)	Draymond Green (8)	TD Garden; 19,156	2–2
5	June 13	Boston	W 104–94	Andrew Wiggins (26)	Andrew Wiggins (13)	Stephen Curry (8)	Chase Center; 18,064	3–2
6	June 16	@ Boston	W 103–90	Stephen Curry (34)	Draymond Green (12)	Draymond Green (8)	TD Garden; 19,156	4–2

== Player statistics ==
Legend
GP	Games played	GS	Games started	MPG	Minutes per game
FG%	Field-goal percentage	3P%	3-point field-goal percentage	FT%	Free-throw percentage
RPG	Rebounds per game	APG	Assists per game	SPG	Steals per game
BPG	Blocks per game	PPG	Points per game

=== Regular season ===
Golden State Warriors statistics
Player	GP	GS	MPG	FG%	3P%	FT%	RPG	APG	SPG	BPG	PPG
Nemanja Bjelica	71	0	16.1	.468	.362	.728	4.1	2.2	.6	.4	6.1
Chris Chiozza	33	1	10.7	.293	.327	1.000	1.0	1.9	.4	.0	1.8
Stephen Curry	64	64	34.5	.437	.380	.923	5.2	6.3	1.3	.4	25.5
Jeff Dowtin ^{‡}	4	0	7.0	.500	.000	–	1.8	.8	.0	.3	1.5
Draymond Green	46	44	28.9	.525	.296	.659	7.3	7.0	1.3	1.1	7.5
Andre Iguodala	31	0	19.5	.380	.230	.750	3.2	3.7	.9	.7	4.0
Jonathan Kuminga	70	12	16.9	.513	.336	.684	3.3	.9	.4	.3	9.3
Damion Lee	58	4	20.0	.441	.344	.868	3.2	1.0	.7	.1	7.5
Kevon Looney	82	80	21.1	.571	.000	.600	7.3	2.0	.6	.6	6.0
Moses Moody	52	11	11.7	.437	.364	.778	1.5	.4	.1	.2	4.4
Gary Payton II	71	16	17.6	.616	.358	.603	3.5	.9	1.4	.3	7.1
Jordan Poole	76	51	30.0	.448	.364	.925	3.4	4.0	.8	.3	18.5
Otto Porter	63	15	22.2	.464	.370	.803	5.7	1.5	1.1	.5	8.2
Klay Thompson	32	32	29.4	.429	.385	.902	3.9	2.8	.5	.5	20.4
Juan Toscano-Anderson	73	6	13.6	.489	.322	.571	2.4	1.7	.7	.2	4.1
Quinndary Weatherspoon ^{≠}	9	0	7.6	.600	.250	1.000	1.6	.4	.1	.1	3.3
Andrew Wiggins	73	73	31.9	.466	.393	.634	4.5	2.2	1.0	.7	17.2

Through March 28, 2022.
^{‡} Waived during the season
^{†} Traded during the season
^{≠} Acquired during the season

== Transactions ==
=== Overview ===
Players Added

Draft

- (Democratic Republic of the Congo) Jonathan Kuminga
- (United States) Moses Moody

Free agency

- (Serbia) Nemanja Bjelica
- (United States) Otto Porter Jr.
- (United States) Andre Iguodala

Two-way contract

- (United States) Chris Chiozza
- (United States) Jeff Dowtin
- (United States) Quinndary Weatherspoon
Players Lost

Free agency

- (United States) Kent Bazemore
- (United States) Kelly Oubre Jr.
- (Italy) Nico Mannion

Traded

- (United States) Eric Paschall

Waived

- (Serbia) Alen Smailagić
- (United States) Jeff Dowtin
- (Canada) Mychal Mulder

=== Trades ===
August 7, 2021	To Golden State Warriors • 2026 MEM protected second-round pick	To Utah Jazz • (United States) Eric Paschall

=== Free agency ===
==== Re-signed ====
Date	Player	Ref.
October 19, 2021	(United States) Gary Payton II	

==== Additions ====
Date	Player	Former team	Ref.
August 6, 2021	(Serbia) Nemanja Bjelica	Miami Heat	
August 6, 2021	(United States) Otto Porter Jr.	Orlando Magic	
August 10, 2021	(United States) Andre Iguodala	Miami Heat	
August 14, 2021	(United States) Chris Chiozza	Brooklyn Nets	
October 18, 2021	(United States) Jeff Dowtin	Orlando Magic	
December 23, 2021	(United States) Quinndary Weatherspoon	Santa Cruz Warriors (NBA G League)	

==== Subtractions ====
Date	Player	Reason	New team	Ref.
August 4, 2021	(Serbia) Alen Smailagić	Waived	KK Partizan (Serbia)	
August 6, 2021	(United States) Kent Bazemore	Free agency	Los Angeles Lakers	
August 7, 2021	(United States) Kelly Oubre Jr.	Free agency	Charlotte Hornets	
August 10, 2021	(Italy) Nico Mannion	Free agency	Virtus Bologna (Italy)	
October 15, 2021	(Canada) Mychal Mulder	Waived	Orlando Magic	
October 15, 2021	(United States) Gary Payton II	Waived	Golden State Warriors	
January 2, 2022	(United States) Jeff Dowtin	Waived	Milwaukee Bucks	

== Awards ==
Recipient	Award	Date awarded	Ref.
(United States) Stephen Curry	Western Conference Player of the Week	October 19 – October 25	
(United States) Stephen Curry	Western Conference Player of the Week	November 8 – November 14	
(United States) Stephen Curry	Western Conference Player of the Month (October/November)	December 2, 2021	
(United States) Stephen Curry	NBA All-Star Game Most Valuable Player	February 20, 2022	
(United States) Stephen Curry	Western Conference Finals Most Valuable Player	May 26, 2022	
(United States) Stephen Curry	Finals Most Valuable Player	June 16, 2022	
