= 2021–22 Indiana Pacers season =

- Head coach: Rick Carlisle
- President: Kevin Pritchard
- General manager: Chad Buchanan
- Owners: Herbert Simon
- Arena: Gainbridge Fieldhouse

Results
- Record: 25–57 (.305)
- Place: Division: 4th (Central); Conference: 13th (Eastern)
- Playoff finish: Did not qualify
- Stats at Basketball Reference

Local media
- Television: Bally Sports Indiana
- Radio: 1070 The Fan

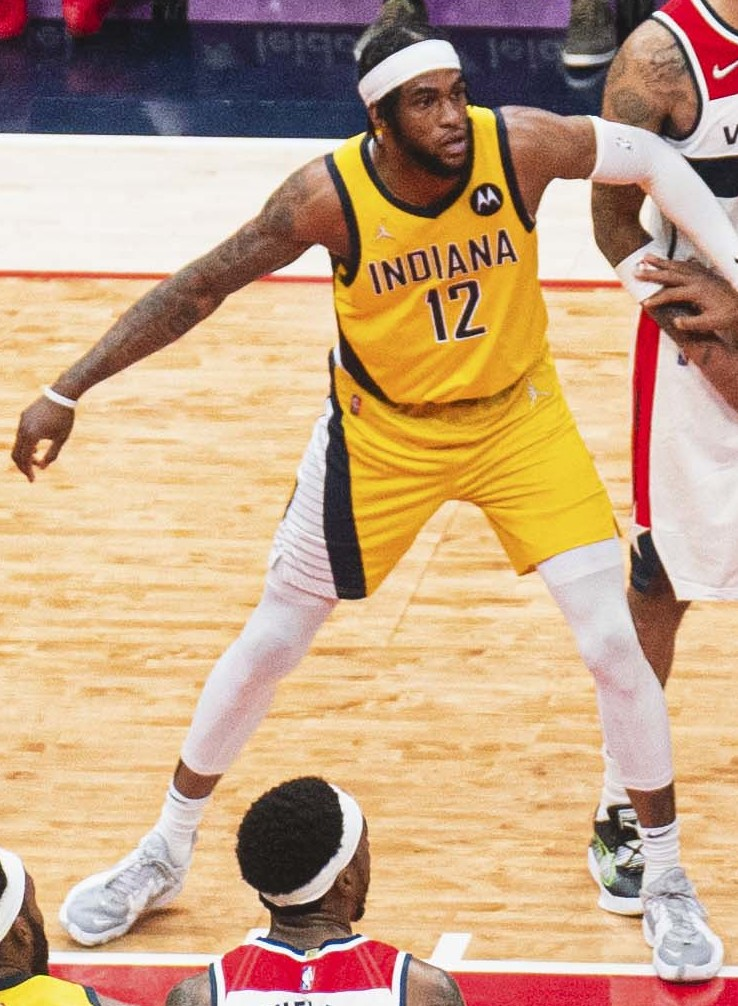
Oshae Brissett playing for the Pacers in March 2022.

The 2021–22 Indiana Pacers season was the 55th season of the franchise and the 46th season in the National Basketball Association (NBA). After the Pacers failed to make the NBA playoffs for the first time since 2015, Nate Bjorkgren was fired on June 9, 2021. The Pacers would later re-hire Rick Carlisle back as the new head coach, reuniting him with the Pacers for their second stint after coaching the team from 2003 to 2007 after coaching 13 seasons with the Dallas Mavericks. The Pacers missed the playoffs for the second consecutive season which would be the first time since 2007–10 that they missed the playoffs in consecutive seasons.

During the trade deadline, the Pacers acquired Tyrese Haliburton and Buddy Hield in a deal surrounding Domantas Sabonis. The team also acquired the services of Jalen Smith. Standout rookie Chris Duarte was selected to the 2022 NBA All-Rookie Second Team. This season also welcomed back fan–favorite and former Pacer Lance Stephenson for a third stint with the franchise.

== NBA draft ==
Round	Pick	Player	Position	Nationality	College/Club
1	13	Chris Duarte	SG	Dominican Republic	Oregon (Sr.)
2	54	Sandro Mamukelashvili	C	Georgia	Seton Hall (Sr.)
2	60	Georgios Kalaitzakis	SF	Greece	Panathinaikos (Greece)

Entering the draft, the Pacers had one first-round pick and two acquired second-round picks. Their original second-round pick was conveyed to the Brooklyn Nets after landing outside the top 45–60 protection range for the first time since the condition took effect in 2017.

== Roster ==
2021–22 Indiana Pacers roster
Players

Pos.	No.	Player	Height	Weight	DOB	From
F/C	88	Goga Bitadze	6 ft 11 in (2.11 m)	250 lb (113 kg)	1999-07-20	Georgia
G/F	12	Oshae Brissett	6 ft 7 in (2.01 m)	210 lb (95 kg)	1998-06-20	Syracuse
G	7	Malcolm Brogdon	6 ft 5 in (1.96 m)	229 lb (104 kg)	1992-12-11	Virginia
G/F	3	Chris Duarte	6 ft 6 in (1.98 m)	190 lb (86 kg)	1997-06-13	Oregon
G	0	Tyrese Haliburton	6 ft 5 in (1.96 m)	185 lb (84 kg)	2000-02-29	Iowa State
G	24	Buddy Hield	6 ft 4 in (1.93 m)	220 lb (100 kg)	1992-12-17	Oklahoma
G	14	Nate Hinton (TW)	6 ft 5 in (1.96 m)	210 lb (95 kg)	1999-06-08	Houston
F/C	23	Isaiah Jackson	6 ft 10 in (2.08 m)	205 lb (93 kg)	2002-01-10	Kentucky
G	9	T. J. McConnell	6 ft 1 in (1.85 m)	190 lb (86 kg)	1992-03-25	Arizona
G	99	Ricky Rubio (injured)	6 ft 3 in (1.91 m)	190 lb (86 kg)	1990-10-21	Spain
F	25	Jalen Smith	6 ft 10 in (2.08 m)	215 lb (98 kg)	2000-03-16	Maryland
G/F	6	Lance Stephenson	6 ft 5 in (1.96 m)	210 lb (95 kg)	1990-09-05	Cincinnati
F	32	Terry Taylor	6 ft 5 in (1.96 m)	230 lb (104 kg)	1999-09-23	Austin Peay
F/C	33	Myles Turner (injured)	6 ft 11 in (2.11 m)	250 lb (113 kg)	1996-03-24	Texas
F	1	T. J. Warren (injured)	6 ft 8 in (2.03 m)	220 lb (100 kg)	1993-09-05	NC State
G	4	Duane Washington	6 ft 2 in (1.88 m)	197 lb (89 kg)	2000-03-24	Ohio State
G	8	Gabe York (TW)	6 ft 3 in (1.91 m)	190 lb (86 kg)	1993-08-02	Arizona

Coaches
Head coach
- Rick Carlisle
Assistant(s)
- Jenny Boucek
- Ronald Nored
- Jannero Pargo
- Lloyd Pierce

Legend
- (DP) Unsigned draft pick
- (FA) Free agent
- (S) Suspended
- (GL) On assignment to G League affiliate
- (TW) Two-way affiliate player
- Injured

Roster
Updated: April 7, 2022

== Standings ==
=== Division ===
Central Division	W	L	PCT	GB	Home	Road	Div	GP
y – Milwaukee Bucks	51	31	.622	–	27‍–‍14	24‍–‍17	12–4	82
x – Chicago Bulls	46	36	.561	5.0	27‍–‍14	19‍–‍22	10–6	82
pi − Cleveland Cavaliers	44	38	.537	7.0	25‍–‍16	19‍–‍22	10–6	82
Indiana Pacers	25	57	.305	26.0	16‍–‍25	9‍–‍32	2–14	82
Detroit Pistons	23	59	.280	28.0	13‍–‍28	10‍–‍31	6–10	82

=== Conference ===
Eastern Conference
#	Team	W	L	PCT	GB	GP
1	c – Miami Heat *	53	29	.646	–	82
2	y – Boston Celtics *	51	31	.622	2.0	82
3	y – Milwaukee Bucks *	51	31	.622	2.0	82
4	x – Philadelphia 76ers	51	31	.622	2.0	82
5	x – Toronto Raptors	48	34	.585	5.0	82
6	x – Chicago Bulls	46	36	.561	7.0	82
7	x − Brooklyn Nets	44	38	.537	9.0	82
8	pi − Cleveland Cavaliers	44	38	.537	9.0	82
9	x − Atlanta Hawks	43	39	.524	10.0	82
10	pi − Charlotte Hornets	43	39	.524	10.0	82
11	New York Knicks	37	45	.451	16.0	82
12	Washington Wizards	35	47	.427	18.0	82
13	Indiana Pacers	25	57	.305	28.0	82
14	Detroit Pistons	23	59	.280	30.0	82
15	Orlando Magic	22	60	.268	31.0	82

=== Record vs. opponents ===
2021-22 NBA Records
Team	ATL	BOS	BKN	CHH	CHI	CLE	DAL	DEN	DET	GSW	HOU	IND	LAC	LAL	MEM	MIA	MIL	MIN	NOP	NYK	OKC	ORL	PHI	PHO	POR	SAC	SAS	TOR	UTA	WAS

== Game log ==
=== Preseason ===
2021 preseason game log
Total: 2–2 (Home: 1–1; Road: 1–1)
Preseason: 2–2 (home: 1–1; road: 1–1)

Game	Date	Team	Score	High points	High rebounds	High assists	Location Attendance	Record
1	October 5	@ New York	L 104–125	Chris Duarte (15)	Jeremy Lamb (9)	Chris Duarte (5)	Madison Square Garden; 10,090	0–1
2	October 8	@ Cleveland	W 109–100	Malcolm Brogdon (27)	Domantas Sabonis (10)	T. J. McConnell (7)	Rocket Mortgage FieldHouse; 10,024	1–1
3	October 13	Memphis	W 109–107	Domantas Sabonis (24)	Domantas Sabonis (13)	T. J. McConnell (7)	Gainbridge Fieldhouse; 5,997	2–1
4	October 15	Cleveland	W 110–94	Goga Bitadze (18)	Bitadze, Sabonis (6)	T. J. McConnell (5)	Gainbridge Fieldhouse; 6,028	2–2

2021–22 season schedule

=== Regular season ===
2021–22 game log
Total: 25–57 (Home: 16–25; Road: 9–32)
October: 1–6 (home: 1–2; road: 0–4)

Game	Date	Team	Score	High points	High rebounds	High assists	Location Attendance	Record
1	October 20	@ Charlotte	L 122–123	Domantas Sabonis (33)	Domantas Sabonis (15)	Malcolm Brogdon (11)	Spectrum Center; 15,521	0–1
2	October 22	@ Washington	L 134–135 (OT)	Myles Turner (40)	Myles Turner (10)	Malcolm Brogdon (8)	Capital One Arena; 15,407	0–2
3	October 23	Miami	W 102–91 (OT)	Chris Duarte (19)	Malcolm Brogdon (14)	T. J. McConnell (5)	Gainbridge Fieldhouse; 17,147	1–2
4	October 25	Milwaukee	L 109–119	Malcolm Brogdon (25)	Domantas Sabonis (13)	Malcolm Brogdon (7)	Gainbridge Fieldhouse; 10,339	1–3
5	October 27	@ Toronto	L 100–118	Malcolm Brogdon (18)	Domantas Sabonis (8)	Malcolm Brogdon (5)	Scotiabank Arena; 19,800	1–4
6	October 29	@ Brooklyn	L 98–105	Torrey Craig (28)	Torrey Craig (11)	Domantas Sabonis (6)	Barclays Center; 16,139	1–5
7	October 30	Toronto	L 94–97	Domantas Sabonis (22)	Domantas Sabonis (14)	Chris Duarte (6)	Gainbridge Fieldhouse; 10,578	1–6

November: 8–8 (home: 5–2; road: 3–6)

Game	Date	Team	Score	High points	High rebounds	High assists	Location Attendance	Record
8	November 1	San Antonio	W 131–118	Domantas Sabonis (24)	Domantas Sabonis (13)	T. J. McConnell (10)	Gainbridge Fieldhouse; 10,227	2–6
9	November 3	New York	W 111–98	Myles Turner (25)	Myles Turner (13)	Malcolm Brogdon (7)	Gainbridge Fieldhouse; 11,607	3–6
10	November 5	@ Portland	L 106–110	T. J. McConnell (19)	Domantas Sabonis (12)	LeVert, Wanamaker 6	Moda Center; 16,841	3–7
11	November 7	@ Sacramento	W 94–91	Caris LeVert (22)	Myles Turner (15)	T. J. McConnell (4)	Golden 1 Center; 12,993	4–7
12	November 10	@ Denver	L 98–101	Malcolm Brogdon (25)	Domantas Sabonis (19)	T. J. McConnell (9)	Ball Arena; 15,232	4–8
13	November 11	@ Utah	W 111–100	Malcolm Brogdon (30)	Brogdon, Turner (9)	McConnell, Sabonis (9)	Vivint Arena; 18,306	5–8
14	November 13	Philadelphia	W 118–113	Justin Holiday (27)	Malcolm Brogdon (10)	Malcolm Brogdon (10)	Gainbridge Fieldhouse; 14,483	6–8
15	November 15	@ New York	L 84–92	Malcolm Brogdon (22)	Domantas Sabonis (15)	Malcolm Brogdon (7)	Madison Square Garden; 16,792	6–9
16	November 17	@ Detroit	L 89–97	Malcolm Brogdon (20)	Domantas Sabonis (11)	Brogdon, McConnell (4)	Little Caesars Arena; 11,457	6–10
17	November 19	@ Charlotte	L 118–121	Malcolm Brogdon (16)	Torrey Craig (7)	Jeremy Lamb (5)	Spectrum Center; 16,787	6–11
18	November 20	New Orleans	W 111–94	Domantas Sabonis (20)	Domantas Sabonis (10)	Domantas Sabonis (6)	Gainbridge Fieldhouse; 15,081	7–11
19	November 22	@ Chicago	W 109–77	Domantas Sabonis (21)	Domantas Sabonis (11)	Malcolm Brogdon (7)	United Center; 21,586	8–11
20	November 24	L.A. Lakers	L 116–124 (OT)	Malcolm Brogdon (28)	Domantas Sabonis (12)	T. J. McConnell (8)	Gainbridge Fieldhouse; 15,572	8–12
21	November 26	Toronto	W 114–97	Domantas Sabonis (23)	Domantas Sabonis (18)	Malcolm Brogdon (12)	Gainbridge Fieldhouse; 14,579	9–12
22	November 28	Milwaukee	L 100–118	Caris LeVert (23)	Domantas Sabonis (10)	Domantas Sabonis (5)	Gainbridge Fieldhouse; 13,130	9–13
23	November 29	@ Minnesota	L 98–100	Malcolm Brogdon (25)	Domantas Sabonis (25)	Domantas Sabonis (10)	Target Center; 14,191	9–14

December: 5–8 (home: 5–5; road: 0–3)

Game	Date	Team	Score	High points	High rebounds	High assists	Location Attendance	Record
24	December 1	Atlanta	L 111–114	Malcolm Brogdon (27)	Domantas Sabonis (10)	Malcolm Brogdon (9)	Gainbridge Fieldhouse; 12,656	9–15
25	December 3	Miami	L 104–113	Caris LeVert (27)	Domantas Sabonis (16)	Malcolm Brogdon (7)	Gainbridge Fieldhouse; 13,854	9–16
26	December 6	Washington	W 116–110	Domantas Sabonis (30)	Domantas Sabonis (10)	Malcolm Brogdon (8)	Gainbridge Fieldhouse; 12,581	10–16
27	December 8	New York	W 122–102	Chris Duarte (23)	Domantas Sabonis (11)	Duarte, LeVert (60)	Gainbridge Fieldhouse; 13,167	11–16
28	December 10	Dallas	W 106–93	Caris LeVert (26)	Sabonis, Turner (10)	Malcolm Brogdon (8)	Gainbridge Fieldhouse; 12,618	12–16
29	December 13	Golden State	L 100–102	Domantas Sabonis (30)	Domantas Sabonis (11)	Malcolm Brogdon (8)	Gainbridge Fieldhouse; 17,018	12–17
30	December 15	@ Milwaukee	L 99–114	LeVert, Sabonis (16)	Domantas Sabonis (14)	Brogdon, Sabonis, Wanamaker (5)	Fiserv Forum; 17,341	12–18
31	December 16	Detroit	W 122–113	Caris LeVert (31)	Duarte, Sabonis (9)	Lamb, Sabonis (6)	Gainbridge Fieldhouse; 13,596	13–18
32	December 21	@ Miami	L 96–125	Duarte, LeVert (17)	Myles Turner (7)	Brad Wanamaker (5)	FTX Arena; 19,600	13–19
33	December 23	Houston	W 118–106	Myles Turner (32)	Myles Turner (10)	Caris LeVert (11)	Gainbridge Fieldhouse; 15,089	14–19
34	December 26	@ Chicago	L 105–113	Caris LeVert (27)	Domantas Sabonis (16)	Caris LeVert (9)	United Center; 20,475	14–20
35	December 29	Charlotte	L 108–116	Caris LeVert (27)	Domantas Sabonis (18)	Domantas Sabonis (7)	Gainbridge Fieldhouse; 17,608	14–21
36	December 31	Chicago	L 106–108	Caris LeVert (27)	Domantas Sabonis (14)	LeVert, Sabonis (6)	Gainbridge Fieldhouse; 17,515	14–22

January: 5–11 (home: 2–4; road: 3–7)

Game	Date	Team	Score	High points	High rebounds	High assists	Location Attendance	Record
37	January 2	@ Cleveland	L 104–108	Domantas Sabonis (32)	Domantas Sabonis (13)	Domantas Sabonis (7)	Rocket Mortgage FieldHouse; 17,808	14–23
38	January 4	@ New York	L 94–104	Keifer Sykes (22)	Domantas Sabonis (8)	Keifer Sykes (6)	Madison Square Garden; 18,449	14–24
39	January 5	Brooklyn	L 121–129	Domantas Sabonis (32)	Domantas Sabonis (12)	Domantas Sabonis (10)	Gainbridge Fieldhouse; 14,176	14–25
40	January 8	Utah	W 125–113	Domantas Sabonis (42)	Sabonis, Turner (6)	Lance Stephenson (14)	Gainbridge Fieldhouse; 13,160	15–25
41	January 10	@ Boston	L 98–101 (OT)	Torrey Craig (19)	Domantas Sabonis (23)	Domantas Sabonis (10)	TD Garden; 19,156	15–26
42	January 12	Boston	L 100–119	Myles Turner (18)	Oshae Brissett (9)	Sabonis, Stephenson (6)	Gainbridge Fieldhouse; 13,560	15–27
43	January 14	Phoenix	L 94–112	Justin Holiday (25)	Domantas Sabonis (14)	Caris LeVert (9)	Gainbridge Fieldhouse; 14,019	15–28
44	January 17	@ L.A. Clippers	L 133–139	Caris LeVert (27)	Domantas Sabonis (11)	Domantas Sabonis (7)	Crypto.com Arena; 15,080	15–29
45	January 19	@ L.A. Lakers	W 111–104	Caris LeVert (30)	Torrey Craig (13)	Domantas Sabonis (10)	Crypto.com Arena; 17,818	16–29
46	January 20	@ Golden State	W 121–117 (OT)	Chris Duarte (27)	Goga Bitadze (9)	Goga Bitadze (5)	Chase Center; 18,064	17–29
47	January 22	@ Phoenix	L 103–113	Duarte, Stephenson (17)	Goga Bitadze (11)	Chris Duarte (4)	Footprint Center; 17,071	17–30
48	January 24	@ New Orleans	L 113–117	Duane Washington Jr. (21)	Oshae Brissett (9)	Caris LeVert (8)	Smoothie King Center; 15,581	17–31
49	January 26	Charlotte	L 126–158	Bitadze, Jackson (17)	Bitadze, Brissett, Stephenson (6)	Lance Stephenson (10)	Gainbridge Fieldhouse; 14,116	17–32
50	January 28	@ Oklahoma City	W 113–110 (OT)	Domantas Sabonis (24)	Domantas Sabonis (18)	Domantas Sabonis (10)	Paycom Center; 15,106	18–32
51	January 29	@ Dallas	L 105–132	Duane Washington Jr. (22)	Domantas Sabonis (15)	Domantas Sabonis (8)	American Airlines Center; 19,831	18–33
52	January 31	L.A. Clippers	W 122–116	Isaiah Jackson (26)	Isaiah Jackson (10)	Caris LeVert (9)	Gainbridge Fieldhouse; 14,629	19–33

February: 2–9 (home: 2–5; road: 0–4)

Game	Date	Team	Score	High points	High rebounds	High assists	Location Attendance	Record
53	February 2	Orlando	L 118–119	Caris LeVert (26)	Terry Taylor (16)	Lance Stephenson (6)	Gainbridge Fieldhouse; 14,528	19–34
54	February 4	Chicago	L 115–122	Caris LeVert (42)	Terry Taylor (14)	Caris LeVert (8)	Gainbridge Fieldhouse; 16,355	19–35
55	February 6	@ Cleveland	L 85–98	Chris Duarte (22)	Domantas Sabonis (11)	Domantas Sabonis (4)	Rocket Mortgage FieldHouse; 19,432	19–36
56	February 8	@ Atlanta	L 112–133	Chris Duarte (25)	Terry Taylor (10)	Lance Stephenson (8)	State Farm Arena; 14,265	19–37
57	February 11	Cleveland	L 113–120	Tyrese Haliburton (23)	Oshae Brissett (11)	Buddy Hield (8)	Gainbridge Fieldhouse; 15,075	19–38
58	February 13	Minnesota	L 120–129	Brissett, Haliburton (22)	Oshae Brissett (13)	Tyrese Haliburton (16)	Gainbridge Fieldhouse; 13,532	19–39
59	February 15	@ Milwaukee	L 119–128	Buddy Hield (36)	Terry Taylor (9)	Tyrese Haliburton (8)	Fiserv Forum; 17,341	19–40
60	February 16	Washington	W 113–108	Tyrese Haliburton (21)	Terry Taylor (9)	Tyrese Haliburton (14)	Gainbridge Fieldhouse; 14,540	20–40
61	February 25	Oklahoma City	L 125–129 (OT)	Buddy Hield (29)	Oshae Brissett (15)	Tyrese Haliburton (11)	Gainbridge Fieldhouse; 15,182	20–41
62	February 27	Boston	W 128–107	Oshae Brissett (27)	Jalen Smith (10)	Tyrese Haliburton (9)	Gainbridge Fieldhouse; 16,872	21–41
63	February 28	@ Orlando	L 103–119	Tyrese Haliburton (23)	Jalen Smith (8)	Tyrese Haliburton (7)	Amway Center; 13,014	21–42

March: 4–10 (home: 1–5; road: 3–5)

Game	Date	Team	Score	High points	High rebounds	High assists	Location Attendance	Record
64	March 2	@ Orlando	W 122–114 (OT)	Malcolm Brogdon (31)	Jalen Smith (15)	Malcolm Brogdon (8)	Amway Center; 11,221	22–42
65	March 4	@ Detroit	L 106–111	Malcolm Brogdon (26)	Jalen Smith (11)	Buddy Hield (9)	Little Caesars Arena; 17,244	22–43
66	March 6	@ Washington	L 123–133	Malcolm Brogdon (27)	Buddy Hield (8)	Tyrese Haliburton (11)	Capital One Arena; 13,937	22–44
67	March 8	Cleveland	L 124–127	Tyrese Haliburton (25)	Goga Bitadze (9)	Malcolm Brogdon (12)	Gainbridge Fieldhouse; 14,066	22–45
68	March 12	@ San Antonio	W 119–108	Haliburton, Washington Jr. (19)	Jalen Smith (11)	Tyrese Haliburton (10)	AT&T Center; 14,605	23–45
69	March 13	@ Atlanta	L 128–131	Haliburton, Hield (25)	Isaiah Jackson (15)	Tyrese Haliburton (10)	State Farm Arena; 17,038	23–46
70	March 15	Memphis	L 102–135	Jalen Smith (15)	Smith, Taylor (8)	Tyrese Haliburton (8)	Gainbridge Fieldhouse; 15,027	23–47
71	March 18	@ Houston	W 121–118	Malcolm Brogdon (25)	Jalen Smith (10)	Tyrese Haliburton (7)	Toyota Center; 13,748	24–47
72	March 20	Portland	W 129–98	Oshae Brissett (24)	Oshae Brissett (9)	Lance Stephenson (11)	Gainbridge Fieldhouse; 16,067	25–47
73	March 23	Sacramento	L 109–110	Buddy Hield (25)	Oshae Brissett (10)	Tyrese Haliburton (15)	Gainbridge Fieldhouse; 14,227	25–48
74	March 24	@ Memphis	L 103–133	Lance Stephenson (25)	Justin Anderson (9)	Tyrese Haliburton (8)	FedEx Forum; 16,205	25–49
75	March 26	@ Toronto	L 91–131	Oshae Brissett (21)	Oshae Brissett (8)	Tyrese Haliburton (12)	Scotiabank Arena; 19,800 (0 when game resumed after speaker fire)	25–50
76	March 28	Atlanta	L 123–132	Buddy Hield (26)	Jalen Smith (6)	Tyrese Haliburton (13)	Gainbridge Fieldhouse; 14,212	25–51
77	March 30	Denver	L 118–125	Buddy Hield (20)	Goga Bitadze (10)	Tyrese Haliburton (12)	Gainbridge Fieldhouse; 15,036	25–52

April: 0–5 (home: 0–2; road: 0–3)

Game	Date	Team	Score	High points	High rebounds	High assists	Location Attendance	Record
78	April 1	@ Boston	L 123–128	Tyrese Haliburton (30)	Brissett, Smith (6)	Lance Stephenson (11)	TD Garden; 19,156	25–53
79	April 3	Detroit	L 117–121	Oshae Brissett (20)	Oshae Brissett (10)	Tyrese Haliburton (17)	Gainbridge Fieldhouse; 17,407	25–54
80	April 5	Philadelphia	L 122–131	Buddy Hield (25)	Buddy Hield (11)	Haliburton, Hield, McConnell (5)	Gainbridge Fieldhouse; 15,583	25–55
81	April 9	@ Philadelphia	L 120–133	Oshae Brissett (20)	Brissett, Jackson (7)	Tyrese Haliburton (9)	Wells Fargo Center; 21,171	25–56
82	April 10	@ Brooklyn	L 126–134	Oshae Brissett (28)	Oshae Brissett (8)	Tyrese Haliburton (10)	Barclays Center; 17,967	25–57

2021–22 season schedule

== Player statistics ==
=== Regular season ===
Player	POS	GP	GS	MP	REB	AST	STL	BLK	PTS	MPG	RPG	APG	SPG	BPG	PPG
Oshae Brissett	SF	67	25	1,564	358	72	44	29	613	23.3	5.3	1.1	.7	.4	9.1
Chris Duarte	SG	55	39	1,541	226	114	56	10	720	28.0	4.1	2.1	1.0	.2	13.1
Torrey Craig^{†}	SF	51	14	1,034	195	58	24	19	329	20.3	3.8	1.1	.5	.4	6.5
Goga Bitadze	C	50	16	729	177	55	21	42	349	14.6	3.5	1.1	.4	.8	7.0
Justin Holiday^{†}	SF	49	40	1,416	135	90	36	18	541	28.9	2.8	1.8	.7	.4	11.0
Duane Washington Jr.	PG	48	7	968	83	85	26	3	473	20.2	1.7	1.8	.5	.1	9.9
Domantas Sabonis^{†}	PF	47	46	1,632	567	236	46	22	888	34.7	12.1	5.0	1.0	.5	18.9
Myles Turner	C	42	42	1,235	297	44	28	118	540	29.4	7.1	1.0	.7	2.8	12.9
Lance Stephenson^{†}	PG	40	1	744	112	154	24	4	373	18.6	2.8	3.9	.6	.1	9.3
Caris LeVert^{†}	SG	39	39	1,214	150	173	35	18	728	31.1	3.8	4.4	.9	.5	18.7
Jeremy Lamb^{†}	SF	39	0	613	94	51	23	14	276	15.7	2.4	1.3	.6	.4	7.1
Malcolm Brogdon	PG	36	36	1,206	185	212	30	14	687	33.5	5.1	5.9	.8	.4	19.1
Isaiah Jackson	C	36	15	541	149	10	25	52	297	15.0	4.1	.3	.7	1.4	8.3
Terry Taylor	PF	33	7	714	172	41	14	8	318	21.6	5.2	1.2	.4	.2	9.6
Keifer Sykes	PG	32	11	566	45	62	12	4	180	17.7	1.4	1.9	.4	.1	5.6
T. J. McConnell	PG	27	8	652	90	131	29	10	229	24.1	3.3	4.9	1.1	.4	8.5
Kelan Martin^{†}	SF	27	1	444	53	21	13	9	171	16.4	2.0	.8	.5	.3	6.3
Tyrese Haliburton^{†}	PG	26	26	938	112	249	48	15	454	36.1	4.3	9.6	1.8	.6	17.5
Buddy Hield^{†}	SG	26	26	925	132	124	25	10	473	35.6	5.1	4.8	1.0	.4	18.2
Jalen Smith^{†}	PF	22	4	543	168	18	9	23	295	24.7	7.6	.8	.4	1.0	13.4
Brad Wanamaker^{†}	PG	22	1	293	35	48	5	6	76	13.3	1.6	2.2	.2	.3	3.5
Justin Anderson^{†}	SF	13	6	269	40	27	7	6	89	20.7	3.1	2.1	.5	.5	6.8
Tristan Thompson^{†}	C	4	0	66	18	2	0	2	29	16.5	4.5	.5	.0	.5	7.3
Gabe York	SG	2	0	21	2	4	2	1	8	10.5	1.0	2.0	1.0	.5	4.0
Nate Hinton	SG	2	0	2	0	0	0	0	0	1.0	.0	.0	.0	.0	.0
Reggie Perry^{†}	PF	1	0	10	1	0	0	0	2	10.0	1.0	.0	.0	.0	2.0
Ahmad Caver	SG	1	0	1	0	0	0	0	2	1.0	.0	.0	.0	.0	2.0
DeJon Jarreau	SG	1	0	1	0	0	0	0	0	1.0	.0	.0	.0	.0	.0

- ^{†} Denotes player spent time with another team in the season. Stats reflect time with the Pacers only.

== Transactions ==
=== Trades ===
July 30, 2021	To Indiana Pacers Draft rights to Isaiah Todd (No. 31)	To Milwaukee Bucks Draft rights to Sandro Mamukelashvili (No. 54); Draft rights to Georgios Kalaitzakis (No. 60); 2024 second-round pick (Cam Christie); 2026 second-round pick
August 6, 2021 (Five-team trade)	To Indiana Pacers Draft rights to Isaiah Jackson (No. 22) (from LA Lakers)	To Los Angeles Lakers Russell Westbrook (from Washington); 2023 CHI second-round pick (from Washington) (Tristan Vukčević); 2024 second-round pick (from Washington) (Bobi Klintman); 2028 WAS second-round pick (from Washington)
August 6, 2021 (Five-team trade)	To San Antonio Spurs Chandler Hutchison (from Washington); 2022 second-round pick (from Washington) (Christian Koloko)	To Brooklyn Nets 2024 second-round pick (from Washington) (Kyle Filipowski); 2025 second-round pick swap right (from Washington); Draft rights to Nikola Milutinov (2015 No. 26) (from San Antonio)
August 6, 2021 (Five-team trade)	To Washington Wizards Kentavious Caldwell-Pope (from LA Lakers); Spencer Dinwiddie (sign-and-trade) (from Brooklyn); Montrezl Harrell (from LA Lakers); Aaron Holiday (from Indiana); Kyle Kuzma (from LA Lakers); Draft rights to Isaiah Todd (No. 31) (from Indiana); Cash considerations (from Indiana)	
August 7, 2021	To Indiana Pacers 2023 SAS protected second-round pick (did not convert)	To San Antonio Spurs Doug McDermott (sign-and-trade); 2023 IND protected second-round pick (did not convert); 2026 second-round pick swap right
October 6, 2021	To Indiana Pacers Draft rights to Juan Pablo Vaulet (2015 No. 39)	To Brooklyn Nets Edmond Sumner; 2025 MIA protected second-round pick
February 7, 2022	To Indiana Pacers Ricky Rubio; 2022 HOU second-round pick (Andrew Nembhard); 2023 CLE protected first-round pick (Ben Sheppard); 2027 UTA second-round pick	To Cleveland Cavaliers Caris LeVert; 2022 MIA second-round pick (Luke Travers)
February 8, 2022	To Indiana Pacers Tyrese Haliburton; Buddy Hield; Tristan Thompson	To Sacramento Kings Domantas Sabonis; Justin Holiday; Jeremy Lamb; 2023 IND second-round pick (Jordan Walsh)
February 10, 2022	To Indiana Pacers Jalen Smith; 2022 PHO second-round pick (Hugo Besson)	To Phoenix Suns Torrey Craig; Cash considerations

=== Free agents ===
==== Re-signed ====
Player	Signed

==== Additions ====
Player	Signed	Former Team

==== Subtractions ====
Player	Reason Left	Date Left	New Team	Ref.
T. J. Warren	Free agency	-	Brooklyn Nets	
