= Chris Duarte (basketball) =

Dominican basketball player (born 1997)

- Duarte with Saski Baskonia in 2026

No. 5 – Saski Baskonia
- Position: Shooting guard
- League: Liga ACB; EuroLeague

Personal information
- Born: June 13, 1997 (age 29) Puerto Plata, Dominican Republic
- Listed height: 1.98 m (6 ft 6 in)
- Listed weight: 190 lb (86 kg)

Career information
- High school: Redemption Christian Academy (Troy, New York)
- College: Northwest Florida State (2017–2019); Oregon (2019–2021)
- NBA draft: 2021: 1st round, 13th overall pick
- Drafted by: Indiana Pacers
- Playing career: 2021–present

Career history
- 2021–2023: Indiana Pacers
- 2022: →Fort Wayne Mad Ants
- 2023–2024: Sacramento Kings
- 2024–2025: Chicago Bulls
- 2024: →Windy City Bulls
- 2025: Vaqueros de Bayamón
- 2025–2026: Unicaja Málaga
- 2026–present: Baskonia

Career highlights
- NBA All-Rookie Second Team (2022); All-FIBA Champions League Second Team (2026); BSN champion (2025); Third-team All-American – AP, USBWA (2021); Jerry West Award (2021); First-team All-Pac-12 (2021); Pac-12 All-Defensive Team (2021); NABC Junior College Player of the Year (2019)
- Stats at NBA.com
- Stats at Basketball Reference

Christopher Theoret Duarte (/ˈdwɑːrteɪ/ DWAR-tay; born June 13, 1997) is a Dominican professional basketball player for Saski Baskonia of the Liga ACB and the EuroLeague. He played college basketball for the Northwest Florida State Raiders and the Oregon Ducks. At Northwest Florida State, he was named NABC NJCAA Player of the Year in 2019. At Oregon, he received the 2021 Jerry West Award as the nation's top collegiate shooting guard. He was selected 13th overall by the Indiana Pacers in the 2021 NBA draft. Duarte was selected to NBA All-Rookie Second Team honors. He has also played for the Sacramento Kings and the Chicago Bulls.

== Early life ==
Duarte was born in Puerto Plata, Dominican Republic. His father, who died when he was six months old, was Canadian. His mother is Dominican. He shared a love of basketball with his older brother Jean Michel. He moved to New York to play his final two years of high school basketball at Redemption Christian Academy in Troy. He participated in the 2017 Jordan Brand Classic Regional Game. Ranked the fifth-best player in New York by 247Sports, Duarte originally committed to play college basketball for Western Kentucky but instead started his career at Northwest Florida State College.

== College career ==
=== Northwest Florida State (2017–2019) ===
In his freshman season for Northwest Florida State College, Duarte averaged 12.1 points, 6.7 rebounds and two steals in 23.3 minutes per game, earning first-team All-Panhandle Conference honors and helping his team reach the Elite Eight round of the NJCAA Division I Championship. On September 20, 2018, he announced that he would continue his career at NCAA Division I program Oregon after one more season at Northwest Florida State.

As a sophomore, Duarte averaged 19 points, 7.1 rebounds and 2.5 assists per game, helping his team return to the Elite Eight round of the NJCAA Division I Tournament. He scored 32 points on 11-of-13 shooting against Palm Beach State College. He was recognized as NABC NJCAA Player of the Year and was a first-team NJCAA Division I All-American. Duarte was also named Panhandle Player of the Year by both the media and coaches vote.

=== Oregon (2019–2021) ===
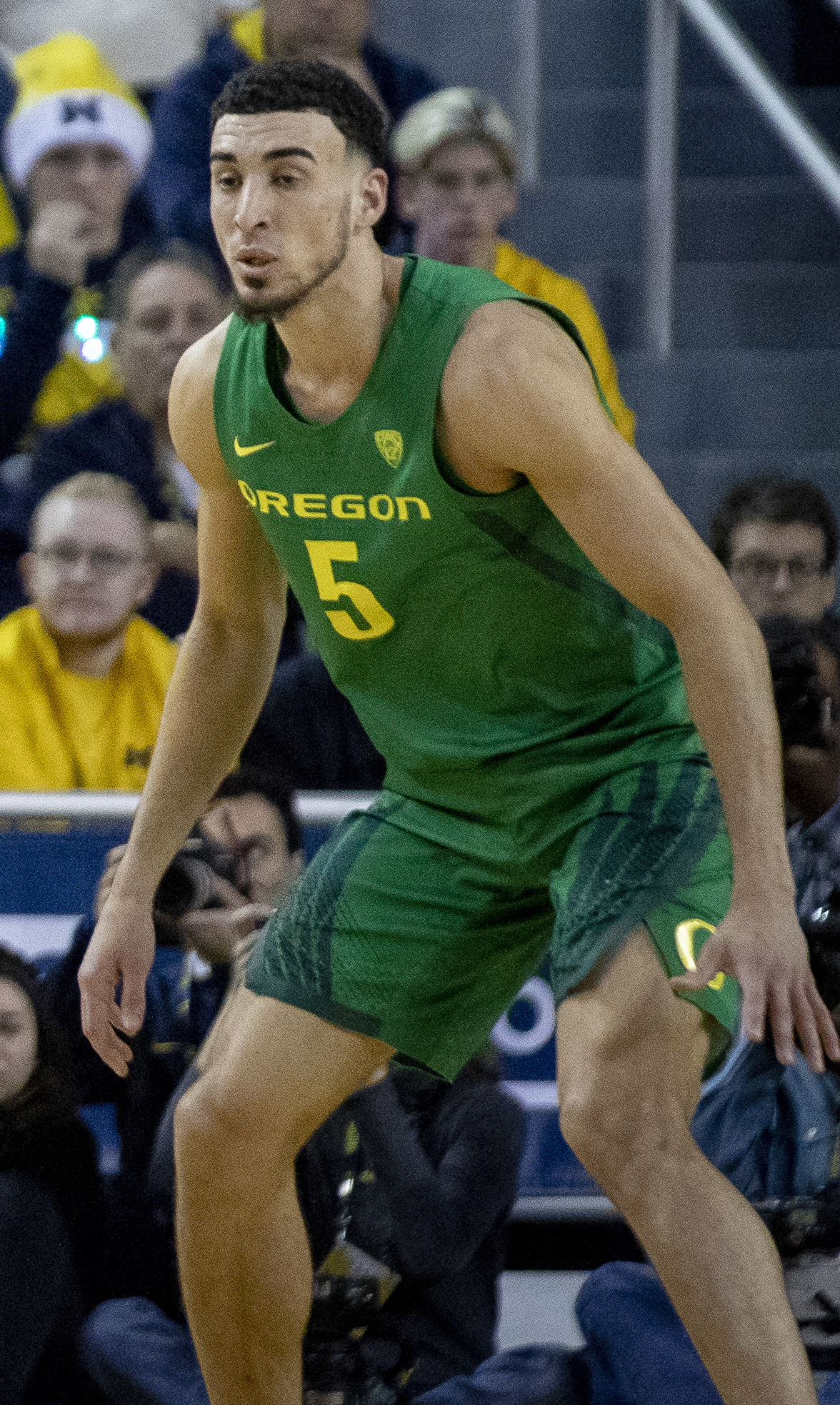
Duarte with Oregon in 2019

Duarte made his debut for Oregon on November 5, 2019, against Fresno State, finishing with 16 points in a 71–57 win. On December 29, Duarte scored a junior season-high 31 points, shooting 12-of-15 from the field and 6-of-9 from three-point range, to go with six assists and five rebounds in a 98–59 win over Alabama State. One day later, he was named Pac-12 Conference Player of the Week. On January 23, 2020, Duarte recorded 30 points, 11 rebounds and eight steals in a 79–70 victory over USC. He set the Matthew Knight Arena record for single-game steals and became the first Division I player with at least 30 points, 11 rebounds and eight steals since Niagara's Alvin Young in 1999. Duarte was subsequently named Pac-12 Player of the Week for his second time and United States Basketball Writers Association (USBWA) National Player of the Week. He finished the season averaging 12.9 points, 5.6 rebounds and 1.7 steals per game, collecting both All-Pac-12 honorable mention and Pac-12 All-Defensive honorable mention.

During the 2020–21 season, Duarte led the Ducks to an appearance in the Sweet Sixteen of the NCAA Division I men's basketball tournament. On April 3, 2021, Duarte was named recipient of the 2021 Jerry West Award as the top shooting guard in men's collegiate basketball. Duarte was additionally recognized as the AP Pac-12 Player of the Year and an AP Third Team All-American.

On March 29, 2021, Oregon head coach Dana Altman indicated in a press conference that Duarte would enter the 2021 NBA draft.

== Professional career ==
=== Indiana Pacers / Fort Wayne Mad Ants (2021–2023) ===
Duarte was selected with the 13th pick in the 2021 NBA draft by the Indiana Pacers. On August 4, 2021, he signed a rookie-scale contract with the Pacers. On October 20, Duarte made his NBA debut, recording 27 points on 6-of-9 three-point shooting, five rebounds along with a steal to set the Pacers' franchise record for the most points in a rookie debut, in a 123–122 loss to the Charlotte Hornets. and on December 17, he had a four-day assignment to the Fort Wayne Mad Ants. Duarte participated in the NBA's 2022 Rising Stars Challenge alongside teammate Tyrese Haliburton. On April 4, 2022, he was ruled out for the remainder of the season with a toe injury. Duarte was selected to the 2022 NBA All-Rookie Second Team.

=== Sacramento Kings (2023–2024) ===
On July 6, 2023, Duarte was traded to the Sacramento Kings for two future second-round picks.

=== Chicago / Windy City Bulls (2024–2025) ===
On July 8, 2024, Duarte was traded to the Chicago Bulls as part of the sign-and-trade deal that sent DeMar DeRozan to the Kings. On December 17, he had a four-day assignment with the Windy City Bulls and on February 3, 2025, he was waived by the Bulls.

=== Vaqueros de Bayamon (2025) ===
On March 10, 2025, Duarte signed with Vaqueros de Bayamón of the Baloncesto Superior Nacional. He would join Danilo Gallinari and JaVale McGee as the imports. On August 12, 2025, he helped Bayamón acquire their 17th championship.

=== Unicaja Málaga (2025–2026) ===
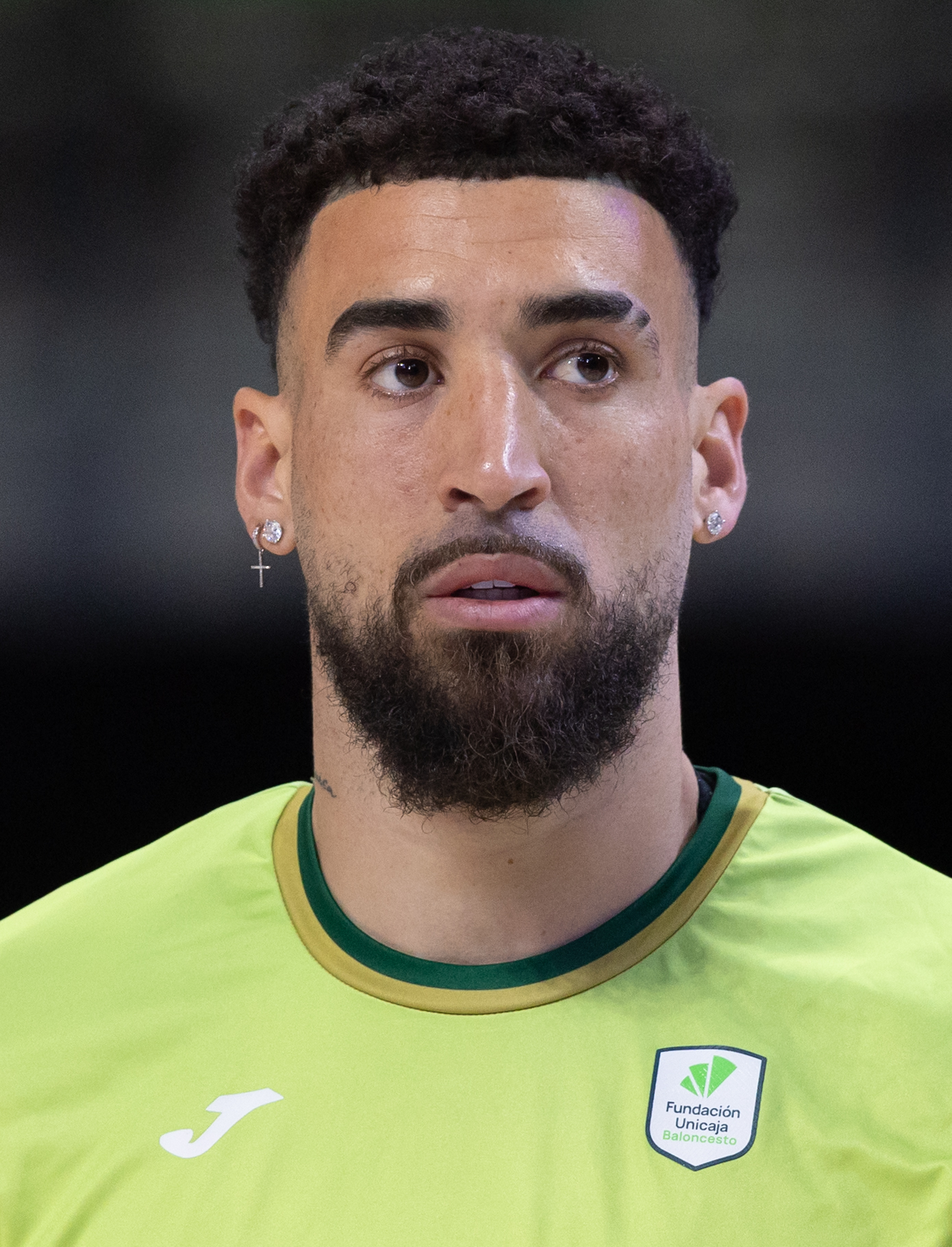
Duarte with Unicaja in 2026

On July 1, 2025, Duarte signed with Unicaja of the Spanish Liga ACB. In May 2026, Duarte was suspended from the team for ten days. The team opened disciplinary proceedings against him and he would have ten business days to submit his defense. On July 16, Duarte and Unicaja agreed to mutually part ways.

=== Baskonia (2026–present) ===
On July 17, 2026, Duarte signed a two–year deal with Kosner Baskonia of the Liga ACB and the EuroLeague.

== Personal life ==
In January 2022, Duarte welcomed his second child, a daughter, with his girlfriend.

== Career statistics ==
Legend
| GP | Games played | GS | Games started | MPG | Minutes per game |
| FG% | Field goal percentage | 3P% | 3-point field goal percentage | FT% | Free throw percentage |
| RPG | Rebounds per game | APG | Assists per game | SPG | Steals per game |
| BPG | Blocks per game | PPG | Points per game | **Bold** | Career high |

=== NBA ===
| Year | Team | GP | GS | MPG | FG% | 3P% | FT% | RPG | APG | SPG | BPG | PPG |
|---|---|---|---|---|---|---|---|---|---|---|---|---|
| 2021–22 | Indiana | 55 | **39** | **28.0** | .432 | .369 | .804 | **4.1** | **2.1** | **1.0** | **.2** | **13.1** |
| 2022–23 | Indiana | 46 | 12 | 19.5 | .369 | .316 | **.847** | 2.5 | 1.4 | .5 | **.2** | 7.9 |
| 2023–24 | Sacramento | **59** | 11 | 12.2 | .381 | .346 | .788 | 1.8 | .7 | .5 | .1 | 3.9 |
| 2024–25 | Chicago | 17 | 0 | 4.4 | **.462** | **.400** | .750 | 1.2 | .5 | .0 | .0 | 2.1 |
| Career | | 177 | 62 | 18.3 | .406 | .349 | .813 | 2.6 | 1.3 | .6 | .2 | 7.6 |

=== College ===
==== NCAA Division I ====
| Year | Team | GP | GS | MPG | FG% | 3P% | FT% | RPG | APG | SPG | BPG | PPG |
|---|---|---|---|---|---|---|---|---|---|---|---|---|
| 2019–20 | Oregon | **28** | **28** | 30.1 | .414 | .336 | .795 | **5.6** | 1.6 | 1.7 | .5 | 12.9 |
| 2020–21 | Oregon | 26 | 26 | **34.1** | **.532** | **.424** | **.810** | 4.6 | **2.7** | **1.9** | **.8** | **17.1** |
| Career | | 54 | 54 | 32.0 | .473 | .380 | .803 | 5.1 | 2.1 | 1.8 | .7 | 14.9 |

==== JUCO ====
| Year | Team | GP | GS | MPG | FG% | 3P% | FT% | RPG | APG | SPG | BPG | PPG |
|---|---|---|---|---|---|---|---|---|---|---|---|---|
| 2017–18 | Northwest Florida State | 32 | 1 | 23.3 | **.546** | .367 | .700 | 6.7 | 1.8 | **2.0** | .4 | 12.1 |
| 2018–19 | Northwest Florida State | **33** | **33** | **31.1** | .541 | **.400** | **.808** | **7.1** | **2.5** | 1.2 | **1.1** | **19.0** |
| Career | | 65 | 34 | 27.2 | .543 | .388 | .765 | 6.9 | 2.2 | 1.6 | .7 | 15.6 |
