= Feron Hunt =

American basketball player (born 1999)

No. 44 – Jiangsu Dragons
- Position: Small forward / power forward
- League: CBA

Personal information
- Born: July 5, 1999 (age 27) New Orleans, Louisiana, U.S.
- Listed height: 6 ft 8 in (2.03 m)
- Listed weight: 195 lb (88 kg)

Career information
- High school: DeSoto (DeSoto, Texas)
- College: SMU (2018–2021)
- NBA draft: 2021: undrafted
- Playing career: 2021–present

Career history
- 2021–2022: Texas Legends
- 2022: New York Knicks
- 2022: →Westchester Knicks
- 2022: Westchester Knicks
- 2022–2023: Birmingham Squadron
- 2023: Mornar Barsko zlato
- 2024–2025: Cleveland Charge
- 2025: NBA G League United
- 2025: Motor City Cruise
- 2025–present: Jiangsu Dragons

Career highlights
- Third-team All-AAC (2021)
- Stats at NBA.com
- Stats at Basketball Reference

Feron Amir Hunt (born July 5, 1999) is an American professional basketball player for the Jiangsu Dragons of the Chinese Basketball Association (CBA). He played college basketball for the SMU Mustangs.

== High school career ==
Hunt moved from New Orleans to Texas as a sophomore in high school. He played basketball for DeSoto High School in DeSoto, Texas, averaging 11.2 points and 7.1 rebounds per game as a senior. Hunt first committed to playing college basketball for TCU but decommitted after one month. He later committed to SMU, choosing the Mustangs over Arkansas and Texas A&M, among others.

== College career ==
On March 10, 2019, Hunt recorded 17 points and a career-high 14 rebounds in a 77–71 win against South Florida. As a freshman, he averaged 7.6 points and 6.4 rebounds per game. On February 12, 2020, Hunt posted a career-high 23 points and seven rebounds in a 79–75 win over UConn. As a sophomore, he averaged 11 points and 6.7 rebounds per game. Hunt declared for the 2020 NBA draft before withdrawing and returning to college. He considered sitting out his junior season to focus on social justice issues. On November 30, 2020, he scored a junior season-high 19 points in a 91–54 win against Texas A&M–Corpus Christi. Hunt averaged 11.1 points and 7.9 rebounds per game as a junior, earning Third Team All-American Athletic Conference honors. He declared for the 2021 NBA draft, opting to forgo his remaining college eligibility.

== Professional career ==
=== Texas Legends (2021–2022) ===
After going undrafted in the 2021 NBA draft, Hunt joined the Dallas Mavericks for the NBA Summer League. On August 21, 2021, he signed with the Mavericks. However, he was waived on October 15. On October 23, he signed with the Texas Legends as an affiliate player. He averaged 15.9 points, 4.6 rebounds, 1.8 assists and 1.9 steals per game.

On December 28, Hunt signed a 10-day contract with the New Orleans Pelicans via the hardship exemption. However, he did not play a game for the team. On January 7, 2022, Hunt was reacquired by the Texas Legends.

=== New York Knicks / Westchester Knicks (2022) ===
On March 18, 2022, Hunt signed a two-way contract with the New York Knicks. On November 29, 2022, the New York Knicks announced that they had waived Hunt. On November 30, 2022, Hunt was reacquired by the Westchester Knicks.

=== Birmingham Squadron (2022–2023) ===
On December 5, 2022, the Birmingham Squadron announced that they had acquired Hunt from Westchester Knicks for the returning right to Justin Wright-Foreman and a second-round draft pick in 2023 NBA G League Draft.

On September 1, 2023, Hunt signed with the Meralco Bolts of the Philippine Basketball Association (PBA) as the team's import for the 2023–24 PBA Commissioner's Cup. However, he was released prior to the start of the season.

=== Cleveland Charge (2024–2025) ===
On March 18, 2024, Hunt joined the Cleveland Charge.

== Career statistics ==
Legend
GP	Games played	GS	Games started	MPG	Minutes per game
FG%	Field goal percentage	3P%	3-point field goal percentage	FT%	Free throw percentage
RPG	Rebounds per game	APG	Assists per game	SPG	Steals per game
BPG	Blocks per game	PPG	Points per game	**Bold**	Career high

=== NBA ===
Year	Team	GP	GS	MPG	FG%	3P%	FT%	RPG	APG	SPG	BPG	PPG
2021–22	New York	2	0	4.0	.000	—	—	.5	.5	.5	.0	.0
Career		2	0	4.0	.000	—	—	.5	.5	.5	.0	.0

=== College ===
Year	Team	GP	GS	MPG	FG%	3P%	FT%	RPG	APG	SPG	BPG	PPG
2018–19	SMU	**32**	8	23.5	.554	.250	.691	6.4	.7	.8	**.9**	7.6
2019–20	SMU	30	**17**	**28.2**	.557	**.275**	**.743**	6.7	**1.0**	.7	.8	11.0
2020–21	SMU	16	16	**28.2**	**.560**	.200	.733	**7.9**	.6	**1.1**	**.9**	**11.1**
Career		78	41	26.3	.557	.250	.724	6.8	.8	.8	.9	9.6
