= 2021–22 Chicago Bulls season =

- Head coach: Billy Donovan
- President: Michael Reinsdorf
- General manager: Marc Eversley
- Owner: Jerry Reinsdorf
- Arena: United Center

Results
- Record: 46–36 (.561)
- Place: Division: 2nd (Central); Conference: 6th (Eastern)
- Playoff finish: First round (lost to Bucks 1–4)
- Stats at Basketball Reference

Local media
- Television: NBC Sports Chicago
- Radio: WLS; WSCR

The 2021-22 Chicago Bulls season was the 56th season of the franchise in the National Basketball Association (NBA). After 5 straight non-winning record seasons, the Bulls looked to their off-season major acquisitions. They signed Lonzo Ball and traded for DeMar DeRozan. Highlights included DeRozan's back-to-back buzzer-beater game-winners, the first ever in NBA history, despite them happening on separate calendar years (The New Year's Eve Heave at Indianapolis and New Year's Day at DC). The Bulls had not made the playoffs since the 2016–17 season, but on April 5, 2022, following the loss of the Cleveland Cavaliers to the Orlando Magic, the Bulls clinched a playoff berth, ending their five-year playoff drought. The sixth-seeded Bulls fell to the third-seeded (and defending NBA champion) Milwaukee Bucks in the first round in five games. As of the 2025-26 NBA season, this is the most recent season that the Bulls made the playoffs.

== Draft picks ==
Round	Pick	Player	Position	Nationality	College
2	38	Ayo Dosunmu	PG	United States	Illinois

The Bulls had a single pick in the draft from a second-round swap with the New Orleans Pelicans as part of the Nikola Mirotić trade in 2018. They had traded their original first-round pick, which was top 4 protected, to the Orlando Magic in March 2021 as an exchange for Nikola Vučević.

== Standings ==
=== Division ===
Central Division	W	L	PCT	GB	Home	Road	Div	GP
y – Milwaukee Bucks	51	31	.622	–	27‍–‍14	24‍–‍17	12–4	82
x – Chicago Bulls	46	36	.561	5.0	27‍–‍14	19‍–‍22	10–6	82
pi − Cleveland Cavaliers	44	38	.537	7.0	25‍–‍16	19‍–‍22	10–6	82
Indiana Pacers	25	57	.305	26.0	16‍–‍25	9‍–‍32	2–14	82
Detroit Pistons	23	59	.280	28.0	13‍–‍28	10‍–‍31	6–10	82

=== Conference ===
Eastern Conference
#	Team	W	L	PCT	GB	GP
1	c – Miami Heat *	53	29	.646	–	82
2	y – Boston Celtics *	51	31	.622	2.0	82
3	y – Milwaukee Bucks *	51	31	.622	2.0	82
4	x – Philadelphia 76ers	51	31	.622	2.0	82
5	x – Toronto Raptors	48	34	.585	5.0	82
6	x – Chicago Bulls	46	36	.561	7.0	82
7	x − Brooklyn Nets	44	38	.537	9.0	82
8	pi − Cleveland Cavaliers	44	38	.537	9.0	82
9	x − Atlanta Hawks	43	39	.524	10.0	82
10	pi − Charlotte Hornets	43	39	.524	10.0	82
11	New York Knicks	37	45	.451	16.0	82
12	Washington Wizards	35	47	.427	18.0	82
13	Indiana Pacers	25	57	.305	28.0	82
14	Detroit Pistons	23	59	.280	30.0	82
15	Orlando Magic	22	60	.268	31.0	82

Notes

c – Clinched home court advantage for the conference; y – Clinched division title; x – Clinched playoff spot; pi – Clinched play-in tournament spot; * – Division leader

== Roster ==
2021–22 Chicago Bulls roster
Players

Pos.	No.	Player	Height	Weight	DOB	From
G	2	Lonzo Ball	6 ft 6 in (1.98 m)	190 lb (86 kg)	1997-10-27	UCLA
C	13	Tony Bradley	6 ft 11 in (2.11 m)	248 lb (112 kg)	1998-08-01	North Carolina
G/F	7	Troy Brown	6 ft 6 in (1.98 m)	215 lb (98 kg)	1999-07-28	Oregon
G	6	Alex Caruso	6 ft 5 in (1.96 m)	186 lb (84 kg)	1994-02-28	Texas A&M
F	25	Tyler Cook (TW)	6 ft 8 in (2.03 m)	255 lb (116 kg)	1997-09-23	Iowa
G/F	11	DeMar DeRozan	6 ft 6 in (1.98 m)	220 lb (100 kg)	1989-08-07	USC
G	12	Ayo Dosunmu	6 ft 4 in (1.93 m)	200 lb (91 kg)	2000-01-17	Illinois
G	24	Javonte Green	6 ft 5 in (1.96 m)	205 lb (93 kg)	1993-07-23	Radford
F	14	Malcolm Hill (TW)	6 ft 6 in (1.98 m)	220 lb (100 kg)	1995-10-26	Illinois
F	5	Derrick Jones	6 ft 6 in (1.98 m)	210 lb (95 kg)	1997-02-15	UNLV
G	8	Zach LaVine	6 ft 5 in (1.96 m)	200 lb (91 kg)	1995-03-10	UCLA
F	19	Marko Simonović	6 ft 11 in (2.11 m)	220 lb (100 kg)	1999-10-15	Montenegro
G	21	Matt Thomas	6 ft 3 in (1.91 m)	190 lb (86 kg)	1994-08-04	Iowa State
F/C	3	Tristan Thompson	6 ft 9 in (2.06 m)	254 lb (115 kg)	1991-03-13	Texas
C	9	Nikola Vučević	7 ft 0 in (2.13 m)	260 lb (118 kg)	1990-10-24	USC
G	0	Coby White	6 ft 4 in (1.93 m)	195 lb (88 kg)	2000-02-16	North Carolina
F	44	Patrick Williams	6 ft 7 in (2.01 m)	215 lb (98 kg)	2001-08-26	Florida State

Coaches
Head coach
- Billy Donovan
Assistant(s)
- John Bryant
- Maurice Cheeks
- Damian Cotter
- Chris Fleming
- Josh Longstaff
- Billy Schmidt

Legend
- (DP) Unsigned draft pick
- (FA) Free agent
- (S) Suspended
- (GL) On assignment to G League affiliate
- (TW) Two-way affiliate player
- Injured

Roster
Updated: April 2, 2022

== Game log ==
=== Preseason ===
2021 preseason game log
Total: 4–0 (home: 3–0; road: 1–0)
Preseason: 4–0 (home: 3–0; road: 1–0)

Game	Date	Team	Score	High points	High rebounds	High assists	Location Attendance	Record
1	October 5	Cleveland	W 131–95	Zach LaVine (25)	Alize Johnson (11)	Alex Caruso (10)	United Center; 11,777	1–0
2	October 8	New Orleans	W 121–85	Zach LaVine (21)	Nikola Vučević (10)	Caruso, Johnson (5)	United Center; 13,909	2–0
3	October 10	@ Cleveland	W 102–101	DeMar DeRozan (23)	Alize Johnson (11)	Alex Caruso (4)	Rocket Mortgage FieldHouse; 10,003	3–0
4	October 15	Memphis	W 118–105	Zach LaVine (31)	Nikola Vučević (8)	Ball, LaVine (6)	United Center; 14,412	4–0

2021–22 season schedule

=== Regular season ===
2021–22 game log
Total: 46–36 (home: 27–14; road: 19–22)
October: 5–1 (home: 3–1; road: 2–0)

Game	Date	Team	Score	High points	High rebounds	High assists	Location Attendance	Record
1	October 20	@ Detroit	W 94–88	Zach LaVine (34)	Nikola Vučević (15)	Ball, LaVine, Vučević (4)	Little Caesars Arena; 20,088	1–0
2	October 22	New Orleans	W 128–112	Zach LaVine (32)	Lonzo Ball (10)	Lonzo Ball (10)	United Center; 20,995	2–0
3	October 23	Detroit	W 97–82	DeMar DeRozan (21)	Nikola Vučević (19)	DeMar DeRozan (6)	United Center; 18,888	3–0
4	October 25	@ Toronto	W 111–108	DeMar DeRozan (26)	Nikola Vučević (8)	DeMar DeRozan (6)	Scotiabank Arena; 19,800	4–0
5	October 28	New York	L 103–104	Zach LaVine (25)	Nikola Vučević (8)	Caruso, Vučević (6)	United Center; 20,972	4–1
6	October 30	Utah	W 107–99	DeMar DeRozan (32)	Nikola Vučević (12)	Zach LaVine (5)	United Center; 20,668	5–1

November: 9–7 (home: 4–3; road: 5–4)

Game	Date	Team	Score	High points	High rebounds	High assists	Location Attendance	Record
7	November 1	@ Boston	W 128–114	DeMar DeRozan (37)	Nikola Vučević (10)	Nikola Vučević (9)	TD Garden; 19,156	6–1
8	November 3	@ Philadelphia	L 98–103	DeMar DeRozan (37)	DeRozan, Vučević (10)	Caruso, Vučević (6)	Wells Fargo Center; 20,438	6–2
9	November 6	Philadelphia	L 105–114	Zach LaVine (32)	Nikola Vučević (11)	Lonzo Ball (5)	United Center; 20,936	6–3
10	November 8	Brooklyn	W 118–95	DeMar DeRozan (28)	Nikola Vučević (13)	LaVine, Vučević (5)	United Center; 19,459	7–3
11	November 10	Dallas	W 117–107	Zach LaVine (23)	Nikola Vučević (10)	Ball, DeRozan (6)	United Center; 20,910	8–3
12	November 12	@ Golden State	L 93–119	Zach LaVine (23)	Alize Johnson (7)	Caruso, DeRozan (5)	Chase Center; 18,064	8–4
13	November 14	@ LA Clippers	W 100–90	DeMar DeRozan (35)	Alex Caruso (9)	Caruso, DeRozan (5)	Staples Center; 17,899	9–4
14	November 15	@ LA Lakers	W 121–103	DeMar DeRozan (38)	Tony Bradley (9)	Lonzo Ball (8)	Staples Center; 18,997	10–4
15	November 17	@ Portland	L 107–112	Zach LaVine (30)	Alex Caruso (10)	Alex Caruso (9)	Moda Center; 17,492	10–5
16	November 19	@ Denver	W 114–108	Zach LaVine (36)	Javonte Green (9)	Lonzo Ball (6)	Ball Arena; 19,520	11–5
17	November 21	New York	W 109–103	DeMar DeRozan (31)	Javonte Green (9)	Ball, DeRozan (5)	United Center; 21,813	12–5
18	November 22	Indiana	L 77–109	DeMar DeRozan (18)	Ball, Bradley, Brown Jr., Jones Jr., White (5)	LaVine, White (3)	United Center; 21,586	12–6
19	November 24	@ Houston	L 113–118	Zach LaVine (28)	Nikola Vučević (13)	DeMar DeRozan (7)	Toyota Center; 16,074	12–7
20	November 26	@ Orlando	W 123–88	DeMar DeRozan (23)	Green, Vučević (8)	Lonzo Ball (6)	Amway Center; 18,236	13–7
21	November 27	Miami	L 104–107	DeMar DeRozan (28)	Nikola Vučević (13)	Ball, Caruso (6)	United Center; 21,110	13–8
22	November 29	Charlotte	W 133–119	Nikola Vučević (30)	Nikola Vučević (14)	Lonzo Ball (8)	United Center; 21,366	14–8

December: 9–2 (home: 5–0; road: 4–2)

Game	Date	Team	Score	High points	High rebounds	High assists	Location Attendance	Record
23	December 2	@ New York	W 119–115	DeMar DeRozan (34)	LaVine, Vučević (7)	Ball, Caruso (6)	Madison Square Garden; 19,812	15–8
24	December 4	@ Brooklyn	W 111–107	Zach LaVine (31)	Lonzo Ball (9)	Lonzo Ball (7)	Barclays Center; 18,116	16–8
25	December 6	Denver	W 109–97	Zach LaVine (32)	Ball, Vučević (10)	Dosunmu, LaVine (8)	United Center; 21,236	17–8
26	December 8	@ Cleveland	L 92–115	Zach LaVine (23)	Nikola Vučević (12)	Zach LaVine (9)	Rocket Mortgage FieldHouse; 17,707	17–9
27	December 11	@ Miami	L 92–118	Zach LaVine (33)	Nikola Vučević (8)	Alex Caruso (5)	FTX Arena; 19,731	17–10
PPD	December 14	Detroit	Postponed (COVID-19) (Makeup date: January 11)					
PPD	December 16	@ Toronto	Postponed (COVID-19) (Makeup date: February 3)					
28	December 19	LA Lakers	W 115–110	DeMar DeRozan (38)	Nikola Vučević (13)	DeMar DeRozan (6)	United Center; 21,560	18–10
29	December 20	Houston	W 133–118	DeMar DeRozan (26)	Nikola Vučević (6)	Lonzo Ball (8)	United Center; 21,150	19–10
PPD	December 22	Toronto	Postponed (COVID-19) (Makeup date: January 26)					
30	December 26	Indiana	W 113–105	Zach LaVine (32)	Nikola Vučević (15)	Zach LaVine (5)	United Center; 20,475	20–10
31	December 27	@ Atlanta	W 130–118	DeMar DeRozan (35)	Nikola Vučević (17)	DeMar DeRozan (10)	State Farm Arena; 17,049	21–10
32	December 29	Atlanta	W 131–117	Zach LaVine (25)	Nikola Vučević (20)	Coby White (12)	United Center; 21,372	22–10
33	December 31	@ Indiana	W 108–106	DeMar DeRozan (28)	Nikola Vučević (16)	DeMar DeRozan (6)	Gainbridge Fieldhouse; 17,515	23–10

January: 8–8 (home: 6–2; road: 2–6)

Game	Date	Team	Score	High points	High rebounds	High assists	Location Attendance	Record
34	January 1	@ Washington	W 120–119	Zach LaVine (35)	Nikola Vučević (12)	DeRozan, White (5)	Capital One Arena; 19,043	24–10
35	January 3	Orlando	W 102–98	DeMar DeRozan (29)	Nikola Vučević (17)	Lonzo Ball (7)	United Center; 20,502	25–10
36	January 7	Washington	W 130–122	Zach LaVine (27)	Nikola Vučević (14)	DeMar DeRozan (8)	United Center; 21,700	26–10
37	January 9	@ Dallas	L 99–113	DeRozan, LaVine (20)	Derrick Jones Jr. (8)	DeMar DeRozan (8)	American Airlines Center; 20,041	26–11
38	January 11	Detroit	W 133–87	Nikola Vučević (22)	DeMar DeRozan (12)	DeRozan, LaVine (7)	United Center; 19,886	27–11
39	January 12	Brooklyn	L 112–138	Zach LaVine (22)	Lonzo Ball (7)	Lonzo Ball (7)	United Center; 21,698	27–12
40	January 14	Golden State	L 96–138	Coby White (20)	Nikola Vučević (14)	DeMar DeRozan (7)	United Center; 21,174	27–13
41	January 15	@ Boston	L 112–114	Nikola Vučević (27)	DeMar DeRozan (8)	Ayo Dosunmu (10)	TD Garden; 19,156	27–14
42	January 17	@ Memphis	L 106–119	DeMar DeRozan (24)	Dosunmu, Vučević (10)	Ayo Dosunmu (6)	FedExForum; 17,794	27–15
43	January 19	Cleveland	W 117–104	DeMar DeRozan (30)	Nikola Vučević (12)	Ayo Dosunmu (8)	United Center; 20,824	28–15
44	January 21	@ Milwaukee	L 90–94	DeMar DeRozan (35)	Nikola Vučević (11)	Ayo Dosunmu (6)	Fiserv Forum; 18,013	28–16
45	January 23	@ Orlando	L 95–114	DeMar DeRozan (41)	Nikola Vučević (13)	DeRozan, Vučević (3)	Amway Center; 18,846	28–17
46	January 24	@ Oklahoma City	W 111–110	Nikola Vučević (26)	Nikola Vučević (15)	Ayo Dosunmu (8)	Paycom Center; 14,378	29–17
47	January 26	Toronto	W 111–105	DeMar DeRozan (29)	Nikola Vučević (15)	LaVine, Vučević (8)	United Center; 20,269	30–17
48	January 28	@ San Antonio	L 122–131	DeMar DeRozan (32)	Nikola Vučević (8)	DeMar DeRozan (8)	AT&T Center; 18,354	30–18
49	January 30	Portland	W 130–116	Nikola Vučević (24)	Nikola Vučević (14)	Ayo Dosunmu (11)	United Center; 19,521	31–18

February: 8–5 (home: 6–3; road: 2–2)

Game	Date	Team	Score	High points	High rebounds	High assists	Location Attendance	Record
50	February 1	Orlando	W 126–115	DeMar DeRozan (29)	Nikola Vučević (13)	Ayo Dosunmu (9)	United Center; 20,217	32–18
51	February 3	@ Toronto	L 120–127 (OT)	Nikola Vučević (30)	Nikola Vučević (18)	Ayo Dosunmu (8)	Scotiabank Arena; 0	32–19
52	February 4	@ Indiana	W 122–115	Nikola Vučević (36)	Nikola Vučević (17)	Ayo Dosunmu (14)	Gainbridge Fieldhouse; 16,355	33–19
53	February 6	Philadelphia	L 108–119	DeMar DeRozan (45)	DeMar DeRozan (9)	DeRozan, Dosunmu (7)	United Center; 20,233	33–20
54	February 7	Phoenix	L 124–127	DeMar DeRozan (38)	Nikola Vučević (12)	Zach LaVine (8)	United Center; 20,615	33–21
55	February 9	@ Charlotte	W 121–109	DeMar DeRozan (36)	Nikola Vučević (15)	Nikola Vučević (8)	Spectrum Center; 19,099	34–21
56	February 11	Minnesota	W 134–122	DeMar DeRozan (35)	Nikola Vučević (8)	Ayo Dosunmu (10)	United Center; 20,092	35–21
57	February 12	Oklahoma City	W 106–101	DeMar DeRozan (38)	Nikola Vučević (15)	Ayo Dosunmu (9)	United Center; 20,072	36–21
58	February 14	San Antonio	W 120–109	DeMar DeRozan (40)	Nikola Vučević (16)	DeMar DeRozan (7)	United Center; 21,153	37–21
59	February 16	Sacramento	W 125–118	DeMar DeRozan (38)	Nikola Vučević (10)	DeRozan, Dosunmu, White (6)	United Center; 19,166	38–21
60	February 24	Atlanta	W 112–108	DeMar DeRozan (37)	Nikola Vučević (10)	DeRozan, Dosunmu, LaVine, Vučević (3)	United Center; 21,236	39–21
61	February 26	Memphis	L 110–116	DeMar DeRozan (31)	Nikola Vučević (12)	Zach Lavine (6)	United Center; 21,959	39–22
62	February 28	@ Miami	L 99–112	Zach LaVine (22)	DeRozan, Vučević (7)	Dosunmu, White (6)	FTX Arena; 19,683	39–23

March: 6–9 (home: 3–1; road: 3–8)

Game	Date	Team	Score	High points	High rebounds	High assists	Location Attendance	Record
63	March 3	@ Atlanta	L 124–130	DeRozan, LaVine (22)	Nikola Vučević (11)	DeMar DeRozan (8)	State Farm Arena; 17,522	39–24
64	March 4	Milwaukee	L 112–118	Zach LaVine (30)	Nikola Vučević (9)	Ayo Dosunmu (7)	United Center; 21,259	39–25
65	March 7	@ Philadelphia	L 106–121	Zach LaVine (24)	DeMar DeRozan (11)	DeMar DeRozan (8)	Wells Fargo Center; 20,381	39–26
66	March 9	@ Detroit	W 114–108	DeMar DeRozan (36)	DeMar DeRozan (8)	Ayo Dosunmu (7)	Little Caesars Arena; 18,022	40–26
67	March 12	Cleveland	W 101–91	DeMar DeRozan (25)	Nikola Vučević (14)	Coby White (7)	United Center; 21,727	41–26
68	March 14	@ Sacramento	L 103–112	Zach LaVine (27)	Nikola Vučević (10)	DeRozan, LaVine (6)	Golden 1 Center; 15,943	41–27
69	March 16	@ Utah	L 110–125	Zach LaVine (33)	Nikola Vučević (11)	DeMar DeRozan (7)	Vivint Arena; 18,306	41–28
70	March 18	@ Phoenix	L 102–129	DeMar DeRozan (19)	Green, Vučević (7)	Zach LaVine (9)	Footprint Center; 17,071	41–29
71	March 21	Toronto	W 113–99	DeRozan, LaVine (26)	Nikola Vučević (13)	Caruso, Dosunmu, LaVine (6)	United Center; 21,778	42–29
72	March 22	@ Milwaukee	L 98–126	Nikola Vučević (22)	Nikola Vučević (7)	Zach LaVine (7)	Fiserv Forum; 17,983	42–30
73	March 24	@ New Orleans	L 109–126	Zach LaVine (39)	Nikola Vučević (9)	Coby White (6)	Smoothie King Center; 13,973	42–31
74	March 26	@ Cleveland	W 98–94	Zach LaVine (25)	Nikola Vučević (9)	Alex Caruso (7)	Rocket Mortgage FieldHouse; 19,432	43–31
75	March 28	@ New York	L 104–109	DeMar DeRozan (37)	Nikola Vučević (13)	DeMar DeRozan (7)	Madison Square Garden; 19,812	43–32
76	March 29	@ Washington	W 107–94	DeMar DeRozan (32)	DeRozan, Williams (7)	Ayo Dosunmu (6)	Capital One Arena; 15,922	44–32
77	March 31	LA Clippers	W 135–130 (OT)	DeMar DeRozan (50)	Nikola Vučević (14)	Alex Caruso (7)	United Center; 21,519	45–32

April: 1–4 (home: 0–4; road: 1–0)

Game	Date	Team	Score	High points	High rebounds	High assists	Location Attendance	Record
78	April 2	Miami	L 109–127	Zach LaVine (33)	Nikola Vučević (10)	Nikola Vučević (5)	United Center; 21,697	45–33
79	April 5	Milwaukee	L 106–127	DeMar DeRozan (40)	Tristan Thompson (7)	Alex Caruso (8)	United Center; 20,799	45–34
80	April 6	Boston	L 94–117	DeMar DeRozan (16)	Nikola Vučević (7)	DeMar DeRozan (5)	United Center; 21,095	45–35
81	April 8	Charlotte	L 117–133	Zach LaVine (23)	Brown Jr., Vučević (5)	Zach LaVine (7)	United Center; 21,461	45–36
82	April 10	@ Minnesota	W 124–120	Patrick Williams (35)	Troy Brown Jr. (11)	Ayo Dosunmu (6)	Target Center; 17,136	46–36

2021–22 season schedule

=== Playoffs ===
2022 playoff game log
Total: 1–4 (home: 0–2; road: 1–2)
First Round: 1–4 (home: 0–2; road: 1–2)

Game	Date	Team	Score	High points	High rebounds	High assists	Location Attendance	Series
1	April 17	@ Milwaukee	L 86–93	Nikola Vučević (24)	Nikola Vučević (17)	DeMar DeRozan (6)	Fiserv Forum; 17,717	0–1
2	April 20	@ Milwaukee	W 114–110	DeMar DeRozan (41)	Nikola Vučević (13)	Alex Caruso (10)	Fiserv Forum; 17,688	1–1
3	April 22	Milwaukee	L 81–111	Nikola Vučević (19)	Coby White (8)	Dosunmu, LaVine (5)	United Center; 22,667	1–2
4	April 24	Milwaukee	L 95–119	Zach LaVine (24)	Vučević, Williams (10)	Zach LaVine (13)	United Center; 22,020	1–3
5	April 27	@ Milwaukee	L 100–116	Patrick Williams (23)	Nikola Vučević (16)	DeMar DeRozan (7)	Fiserv Forum; 17,506	1–4

2022 playoff schedule

== Player statistics ==
Player	Pos.	GP	GS	MP	Reb.	Ast.	Stl.	Blk.	Pts.
Lonzo Ball	PG	35	35	1,212	190	178	64	31	455
Jordan Bell^{≠}	C	1	0	2	1	0	1	0	0
Tony Bradley	C	55	7	549	186	27	10	33	163
Troy Brown Jr.	SF	66	7	1,055	203	66	36	5	283
Alex Caruso	PG	41	18	1,147	148	165	71	15	304
Tyler Cook	PF	20	2	200	53	3	4	4	67
DeMar DeRozan	SF	76	76	2,743	392	374	68	24	2,118
Ayo Dosunmu	G	77	40	2,110	214	256	60	29	679
Devon Dotson^{‡}	PG	11	0	85	9	15	1	0	29
Javonte Green	SG/PG	65	45	1,519	276	60	67	32	468
Malcolm Hill^{≠}	SG/SF	16	0	166	29	7	3	2	55
Alize Johnson^{‡}	PF	16	0	121	36	8	3	0	28
Derrick Jones Jr.	SF	51	8	899	169	30	25	33	286
Zach LaVine	SG	67	67	2,328	308	303	41	23	1,635
Mac McClung^{≠}	SG	1	0	3	0	0	0	0	2
Alfonzo McKinnie^{≠}	SF	17	3	206	33	5	2	3	59
Marko Simonović	C	9	0	35	10	0	1	1	17
Matt Thomas	SG	40	0	459	50	20	8	3	161
Tristan Thompson^{≠}	C	23	3	376	109	14	12	7	130
Nikola Vučević	C	73	73	2,418	804	236	70	71	1,288
Coby White	PG	61	17	1,675	182	176	29	11	772
Patrick Williams	PF	17	9	422	69	15	9	9	153

After all games.
^{‡}Waived during the season
^{†}Traded during the season
^{≠}Acquired during the season
