= 2021–22 Cleveland Cavaliers season =

NBA season for the Cleveland Cavaliers (2021–2022)

- Head coach: J. B. Bickerstaff
- President: Koby Altman
- General manager: Mike Gansey
- Owners: Dan Gilbert
- Arena: Rocket Mortgage FieldHouse

Results
- Record: 44–38 (.537)
- Place: Division: 3rd (Central); Conference: 8th (Eastern)
- Playoff finish: Did not qualify
- Stats at Basketball Reference

Local media
- Television: Bally Sports Ohio
- Radio: WTAM · WMMS

The 2021–22 Cleveland Cavaliers season was the 52nd season of the franchise in the National Basketball Association (NBA). The regular season for the league began in the month of October and featured the typical 82-game schedule, returning to its typical format. In the previous season, the league started in the month of December and featured only 72 games due to the ongoing COVID-19 pandemic. The Cavaliers had the third pick in the 2021 NBA draft, and selected Evan Mobley out of the University of Southern California. The NBA announced that the All-Star Game will be played at the Rocket Mortgage FieldHouse in Cleveland, which was held February 20, 2022. The Cavaliers matched their previous win total of 22 on January 7, 2022, improving to 22–17. The Cavaliers clinched their first winning season without LeBron James since 1998 and their first winning season since 2018 with a 107–101 win over the Orlando Magic on March 28, 2022. The Cavaliers qualified for the postseason, but failed to qualify for the playoffs for the fourth consecutive season after losing to both the Brooklyn Nets and Atlanta Hawks in the play-in tournament.

== Draft ==
Round	Pick	Player	Position	Nationality	College / Club
1	3	Evan Mobley	PF/C	United States	USC (Fr.)

With their sole selection in the 2021 NBA draft, the Cavaliers selected Evan Mobley from the University of Southern California as the third overall pick. Their second-round selection was conveyed to the New Orleans Pelicans via the Atlanta Hawks as a replacement for the Cavaliers' protected top-10 first-round picks that failed to convey in 2019 and 2020.

== Roster ==
2021–22 Cleveland Cavaliers roster
Players

Pos.	No.	Player	Height	Weight	DOB	From
C	31	Jarrett Allen	6 ft 11 in (2.11 m)	243 lb (110 kg)	1998-04-21	Texas
C	6	Moses Brown	7 ft 2 in (2.18 m)	245 lb (111 kg)	1999-10-13	UCLA
F/C	21	Ed Davis	6 ft 10 in (2.08 m)	220 lb (100 kg)	1989-06-05	North Carolina
G	10	Darius Garland	6 ft 1 in (1.85 m)	192 lb (87 kg)	2000-01-26	Vanderbilt
G	00	Brandon Goodwin (TW)	6 ft 0 in (1.83 m)	180 lb (82 kg)	1995-10-02	Florida Gulf Coast
G	3	Caris LeVert	6 ft 6 in (1.98 m)	205 lb (93 kg)	1994-08-25	Michigan
F/C	0	Kevin Love	6 ft 8 in (2.03 m)	251 lb (114 kg)	1988-09-07	UCLA
F	24	Lauri Markkanen	7 ft 0 in (2.13 m)	240 lb (109 kg)	1997-05-22	Arizona
F/C	4	Evan Mobley	6 ft 11 in (2.11 m)	215 lb (98 kg)	2001-06-18	USC
G	5	RJ Nembhard (TW)	6 ft 4 in (1.93 m)	200 lb (91 kg)	1999-03-22	TCU
G/F	35	Isaac Okoro	6 ft 5 in (1.96 m)	225 lb (102 kg)	2001-01-26	Auburn
F	16	Cedi Osman	6 ft 7 in (2.01 m)	230 lb (104 kg)	1995-04-08	Turkey
G	1	Rajon Rondo	6 ft 1 in (1.85 m)	180 lb (82 kg)	1986-02-22	Kentucky
G	2	Collin Sexton	6 ft 1 in (1.85 m)	190 lb (86 kg)	1999-01-04	Alabama
F	8	Lamar Stevens	6 ft 6 in (1.98 m)	230 lb (104 kg)	1997-07-09	Penn State
F	32	Dean Wade	6 ft 9 in (2.06 m)	228 lb (103 kg)	1996-11-20	Kansas State
G/F	9	Dylan Windler	6 ft 6 in (1.98 m)	196 lb (89 kg)	1996-09-22	Belmont

Coaches
Head coach
- J. B. Bickerstaff
Assistant(s)
- Greg Buckner
- Mike Gerrity
- Antonio Lang
- Sidney Lowe
- J. J. Outlaw
- Nate Reinking

Legend
- (DP) Unsigned draft pick
- (FA) Free agent
- (S) Suspended
- (GL) On assignment to G League affiliate
- (TW) Two-way affiliate player
- Injured

Roster
Updated: April 2, 2022

== Standings ==
=== Division ===
Central Division	W	L	PCT	GB	Home	Road	Div	GP
y – Milwaukee Bucks	51	31	.622	–	27‍–‍14	24‍–‍17	12–4	82
x – Chicago Bulls	46	36	.561	5.0	27‍–‍14	19‍–‍22	10–6	82
pi − Cleveland Cavaliers	44	38	.537	7.0	25‍–‍16	19‍–‍22	10–6	82
Indiana Pacers	25	57	.305	26.0	16‍–‍25	9‍–‍32	2–14	82
Detroit Pistons	23	59	.280	28.0	13‍–‍28	10‍–‍31	6–10	82

=== Conference ===
Eastern Conference
#	Team	W	L	PCT	GB	GP
1	c – Miami Heat *	53	29	.646	–	82
2	y – Boston Celtics *	51	31	.622	2.0	82
3	y – Milwaukee Bucks *	51	31	.622	2.0	82
4	x – Philadelphia 76ers	51	31	.622	2.0	82
5	x – Toronto Raptors	48	34	.585	5.0	82
6	x – Chicago Bulls	46	36	.561	7.0	82
7	x − Brooklyn Nets	44	38	.537	9.0	82
8	pi − Cleveland Cavaliers	44	38	.537	9.0	82
9	x − Atlanta Hawks	43	39	.524	10.0	82
10	pi − Charlotte Hornets	43	39	.524	10.0	82
11	New York Knicks	37	45	.451	16.0	82
12	Washington Wizards	35	47	.427	18.0	82
13	Indiana Pacers	25	57	.305	28.0	82
14	Detroit Pistons	23	59	.280	30.0	82
15	Orlando Magic	22	60	.268	31.0	82

== Game log ==
=== Preseason ===
2021 preseason game log
Total: 2–3 (Home: 0–2; Road: 2–1)
Preseason: 2–3 (home: 0–2; road: 2–1)

Game	Date	Team	Score	High points	High rebounds	High assists	Location Attendance	Record
1	October 5	@ Chicago	L 95–131	Collin Sexton (14)	Jarrett Allen (10)	Ricky Rubio (6)	United Center; 11,777	0–1
2	October 6	@ Atlanta	W 99–96	Collin Sexton (19)	Evan Mobley (12)	Darius Garland (7)	State Farm Arena; 11,158	1–1
3	October 8	Indiana	L 100–109	Ricky Rubio (14)	Lauri Markkanen (7)	Dean Wade (4)	Rocket Mortgage FieldHouse; 10,024	1–2
4	October 10	Chicago	L 101–102	Lauri Markkanen (18)	Evan Mobley (10)	Ricky Rubio (9)	Rocket Mortgage FieldHouse; 10,003	1–3
5	October 15	@ Indiana	W 110–94	Cedi Osman (14)	Lamar Stevens (8)	Darius Garland (4)	Gainbridge Fieldhouse; 6,028	2–3

2021–22 season schedule

=== Regular season ===
2021–22 game log
Total: 44–38 (Home: 25–17; Road: 19–21)
October: 3–4 (home: 1–1; road: 2–3)

Game	Date	Team	Score	High points	High rebounds	High assists	Location Attendance	Record
1	October 20	@ Memphis	L 121–132	Jarrett Allen (25)	Markkanen, Mobley (9)	Darius Garland (12)	FedExForum; 15,975	0–1
2	October 22	Charlotte	L 112–123	Collin Sexton (33)	Kevin Love (11)	Ricky Rubio (10)	Rocket Mortgage FieldHouse; 17,116	0–2
3	October 23	Atlanta	W 101–95	Ricky Rubio (23)	Jarrett Allen (14)	Ricky Rubio (8)	Rocket Mortgage FieldHouse; 16,846	1–2
4	October 25	@ Denver	W 99–87	Kevin Love (22)	Jarrett Allen (16)	Ricky Rubio (8)	Ball Arena; 14,221	2–2
5	October 27	@ L.A. Clippers	W 92–79	Collin Sexton (26)	Love, Mobley (10)	Darius Garland (6)	Staples Center; 13,276	3–2
6	October 29	@ L.A. Lakers	L 101–113	Evan Mobley (23)	Jarrett Allen (9)	Darius Garland (11)	Staples Center; 18,997	3–3
7	October 30	@ Phoenix	L 92–101	Cedi Osman (20)	Kevin Love (12)	Darius Garland (5)	Footprint Center; 14,516	3–4

November: 8–6 (home: 4–5; road: 4–1)

Game	Date	Team	Score	High points	High rebounds	High assists	Location Attendance	Record
8	November 1	@ Charlotte	W 113–110	Lauri Markkanen (21)	Jarrett Allen (16)	Ricky Rubio (8)	Spectrum Center; 13,889	4–4
9	November 3	Portland	W 107–104	Jarrett Allen (24)	Jarrett Allen (17)	Darius Garland (10)	Rocket Mortgage FieldHouse; 16,231	5–4
10	November 5	@ Toronto	W 102–101	Darius Garland (21)	Jarrett Allen (15)	Darius Garland (8)	Scotiabank Arena; 19,800	6–4
11	November 7	@ New York	W 126–109	Ricky Rubio (37)	Jarrett Allen (17)	Ricky Rubio (10)	Madison Square Garden; 19,040	7–4
12	November 10	Washington	L 94–97	Ricky Rubio (20)	Jarrett Allen (10)	Ricky Rubio (5)	Rocket Mortgage FieldHouse; 18,056	7–5
13	November 12	Detroit	W 98–78	Darius Garland (21)	Isaac Okoro (9)	Ricky Rubio (9)	Rocket Mortgage FieldHouse; 17,095	8–5
14	November 13	Boston	W 91–89	Darius Garland (22)	Evan Mobley (9)	Darius Garland (6)	Rocket Mortgage FieldHouse; 19,432	9–5
15	November 15	Boston	L 92–98	Ricky Rubio (28)	Evan Mobley (9)	Mobley, Osman (5)	Rocket Mortgage FieldHouse; 17,186	9–6
16	November 17	@ Brooklyn	L 99–109	Ricky Rubio (25)	Ed Davis (11)	Darius Garland (6)	Barclays Center; 16,922	9–7
17	November 18	Golden State	L 89–104	Darius Garland (25)	Ed Davis (14)	Darius Garland (6)	Rocket Mortgage FieldHouse; 19,432	9–8
18	November 22	Brooklyn	L 112–117	Darius Garland (24)	Jarrett Allen (15)	Darius Garland (11)	Rocket Mortgage FieldHouse; 17,387	9–9
19	November 24	Phoenix	L 115–120	Jarrett Allen (25)	Allen, Markkanen (11)	Darius Garland (7)	Rocket Mortgage FieldHouse; 18,055	9–10
20	November 27	Orlando	W 105–92	Darius Garland (26)	Jarrett Allen (11)	Darius Garland (11)	Rocket Mortgage FieldHouse; 18,248	10–10
21	November 29	@ Dallas	W 114–96	Jarrett Allen (28)	Jarrett Allen (14)	Darius Garland (9)	American Airlines Center; 19,229	11–10

December: 9–6 (home: 5–3; road: 4–3)

Game	Date	Team	Score	High points	High rebounds	High assists	Location Attendance	Record
22	December 1	@ Miami	W 111–85	Kevin Love (22)	Allen, Mobley (11)	Darius Garland (7)	FTX Arena; 19,600	12–10
23	December 3	@ Washington	W 116–101	Darius Garland (32)	Jarrett Allen (13)	Darius Garland (10)	Capital One Arena; 17,227	13–10
24	December 5	Utah	L 108–109	Darius Garland (31)	Evan Mobley (12)	Darius Garland (5)	Rocket Mortgage FieldHouse; 18,113	13–11
25	December 6	@ Milwaukee	L 104–112	Jarrett Allen (25)	Jarrett Allen (9)	Garland, Rubio (9)	Fiserv Forum; 17,341	13–12
26	December 8	Chicago	W 115–92	Darius Garland (24)	Jarrett Allen (12)	Ricky Rubio (9)	Rocket Mortgage FieldHouse; 17,707	14–12
27	December 10	@ Minnesota	W 123–106	Jarrett Allen (21)	Kevin Love (13)	Darius Garland (12)	Target Center; 15,694	15–12
28	December 11	Sacramento	W 117–103	Isaac Okoro (20)	Evan Mobley (15)	Darius Garland (13)	Rocket Mortgage FieldHouse; 19,432	16–12
29	December 13	Miami	W 105–94	Kevin Love (23)	Kevin Love (9)	Ricky Rubio (7)	Rocket Mortgage FieldHouse; 17,401	17–12
30	December 15	Houston	W 129–84	Darius Garland (21)	Dean Wade (10)	Ricky Rubio (12)	Rocket Mortgage FieldHouse; 17,131	18–12
31	December 18	@ Milwaukee	W 119–90	Cedi Osman (23)	Kevin Love (7)	Ricky Rubio (10)	Fiserv Forum; 17,341	19–12
–	December 19	@ Atlanta	Postponed (COVID-19) (Makeup date: March 31)					
32	December 22	@ Boston	L 101–111	Darius Garland (28)	Kevin Love (12)	Garland, Rubio (6)	TD Garden; 19,156	19–13
33	December 26	Toronto	W 144–99	Garland, Love (22)	Love, Valentine (9)	Darius Garland (8)	Rocket Mortgage FieldHouse; 19,432	20–13
34	December 28	@ New Orleans	L 104–108	Ricky Rubio (27)	Ricky Rubio (13)	Ricky Rubio (9)	Smoothie King Center; 15,835	20–14
35	December 30	@ Washington	L 93–110	Kevin Love (24)	Kevin Love (11)	Kevin Pangos (6)	Capital One Arena; 15,637	20–15
36	December 31	Atlanta	L 118–121	Kevin Love (35)	Kevin Love (11)	Brandon Goodwin (6)	Rocket Mortgage FieldHouse; 17,745	20–16

January: 11–4 (home: 6–1; road: 5–3)

Game	Date	Team	Score	High points	High rebounds	High assists	Location Attendance	Record
37	January 2	Indiana	W 108–104	Evan Mobley (24)	Jarrett Allen (11)	Brandon Goodwin (5)	Rocket Mortgage FieldHouse; 17,808	21–16
38	January 4	Memphis	L 106–110	Darius Garland (27)	Jarrett Allen (12)	Darius Garland (10)	Rocket Mortgage FieldHouse; 18,178	21–17
39	January 7	@ Portland	W 114–101	Darius Garland (26)	Jarrett Allen (13)	Darius Garland (6)	Moda Center; 16,708	22–17
40	January 9	@ Golden State	L 82–96	Lamar Stevens (17)	Allen, Love (7)	Rajon Rondo (5)	Chase Center; 18,064	22–18
41	January 10	@ Sacramento	W 109–108	Allen, Love (18)	Jarrett Allen (17)	Darius Garland (11)	Golden 1 Center; 12,110	23–18
42	January 12	@ Utah	W 111–91	Lamar Stevens (23)	Darius Garland (10)	Darius Garland (15)	Vivint Arena; 18,306	24–18
43	January 14	@ San Antonio	W 114–109	Darius Garland (32)	Jarrett Allen (16)	Darius Garland (8)	AT&T Center; 12,160	25–18
44	January 15	@ Oklahoma City	W 107–102	Darius Garland (27)	Jarrett Allen (13)	Darius Garland (18)	Paycom Center; 15,284	26–18
45	January 17	Brooklyn	W 114–107	Darius Garland (22)	Jarrett Allen (10)	Darius Garland (12)	Rocket Mortgage FieldHouse; 18,105	27–18
46	January 19	@ Chicago	L 104–117	Lauri Markkanen (28)	Jarrett Allen (10)	Darius Garland (12)	United Center; 20,824	27–19
47	January 22	Oklahoma City	W 94–87	Darius Garland (23)	Evan Mobley (17)	Darius Garland (11)	Rocket Mortgage FieldHouse; 19,432	28–19
48	January 24	New York	W 95–93	Kevin Love (20)	Evan Mobley (12)	Darius Garland (12)	Rocket Mortgage FieldHouse; 17,321	29–19
49	January 26	Milwaukee	W 115–99	Kevin Love (25)	Jarrett Allen (10)	Darius Garland (8)	Rocket Mortgage FieldHouse; 18,904	30–19
50	January 30	@ Detroit	L 105–115	Darius Garland (24)	Allen, Mobley (9)	Darius Garland (7)	Little Caesars Arena; 16,811	30–20
51	January 31	New Orleans	W 93–90	Brandon Goodwin (21)	Kevin Love (11)	Cedi Osman (12)	Rocket Mortgage FieldHouse; 17,637	31–20

February: 5–5 (home: 3–1; road: 2–4)

Game	Date	Team	Score	High points	High rebounds	High assists	Location Attendance	Record
52	February 2	@ Houston	L 104–115	Evan Mobley (29)	Kevin Love (13)	Brandon Goodwin (8)	Toyota Center; 14,163	31–21
53	February 4	@ Charlotte	W 102–101	Jarrett Allen (29)	Jarrett Allen (22)	Brandon Goodwin (9)	Spectrum Center; 17,733	32–21
54	February 6	Indiana	W 98–85	Cedi Osman (22)	Jarrett Allen (17)	Rajon Rondo (12)	Rocket Mortgage FieldHouse; 19,432	33–21
55	February 9	San Antonio	W 105–92	Darius Garland (27)	Jarrett Allen (14)	Darius Garland (6)	Rocket Mortgage FieldHouse; 19,432	34–21
56	February 11	@ Indiana	W 120–113	Allen, LeVert (22)	Jarrett Allen (14)	Rajon Rondo (6)	Gainbridge Fieldhouse; 15,075	35–21
57	February 12	@ Philadelphia	L 93–103	Darius Garland (27)	Evan Mobley (8)	Caris LeVert (6)	Wells Fargo Center; 21,057	35–22
58	February 15	@ Atlanta	L 116–124	Darius Garland (30)	Evan Mobley (10)	Darius Garland (8)	State Farm Arena; 15,947	35–23
59	February 24	@ Detroit	L 103–106	Lauri Markkanen (22)	Allen, Mobley (8)	Rajon Rondo (9)	Little Caesars Arena; 15,622	35–24
60	February 26	Washington	W 92–86	Lauri Markkanen (23)	Jarrett Allen (14)	Brandon Goodwin (6)	Rocket Mortgage FieldHouse; 19,432	36–24
61	February 28	Minnesota	L 122–127	Kevin Love (26)	Evan Mobley (10)	Brandon Goodwin (12)	Rocket Mortgage FieldHouse; 18,421	36–25

March: 6–10 (home: 5–5; road: 1–5)

Game	Date	Team	Score	High points	High rebounds	High assists	Location Attendance	Record
62	March 2	Charlotte	L 98–119	Darius Garland (33)	Jarrett Allen (11)	Kevin Love (5)	Rocket Mortgage FieldHouse; 19,019	36–26
63	March 4	@ Philadelphia	L 119–125	Darius Garland (26)	Kevin Love (10)	Darius Garland (19)	Wells Fargo Center; 21,391	36–27
64	March 6	Toronto	W 104–96	Lauri Markkanen (22)	Evan Mobley (17)	Darius Garland (10)	Rocket Mortgage FieldHouse; 19,432	37–27
65	March 8	@ Indiana	W 127–124	Darius Garland (41)	Evan Mobley (12)	Darius Garland (13)	Gainbridge Fieldhouse; 14,066	38–27
66	March 11	@ Miami	L 105–117	Darius Garland (24)	Evan Mobley (12)	Darius Garland (10)	FTX Arena; 19,600	38–28
67	March 12	@ Chicago	L 91–101	Darius Garland (25)	Kevin Love (11)	Darius Garland (7)	United Center; 21,727	38–29
68	March 14	L.A. Clippers	W 120–111 (OT)	Evan Mobley (30)	Love, Markkanen (9)	Darius Garland (13)	Rocket Mortgage FieldHouse; 18,742	39–29
69	March 16	Philadelphia	L 114–118	Darius Garland (22)	Evan Mobley (9)	Garland, LeVert (7)	Rocket Mortgage FieldHouse; 19,432	39–30
70	March 18	Denver	W 119–116 (OT)	Lauri Markkanen (31)	Evan Mobley (11)	Darius Garland (14)	Rocket Mortgage FieldHouse; 19,432	40–30
71	March 19	Detroit	W 113–109	Darius Garland (24)	Evan Mobley (11)	Darius Garland (12)	Rocket Mortgage FieldHouse; 19,432	41–30
72	March 21	L.A. Lakers	L 120–131	Darius Garland (29)	Lauri Markkanen (9)	Darius Garland (17)	Rocket Mortgage FieldHouse; 19,432	41–31
73	March 24	@ Toronto	L 104–117	Lauri Markkanen (20)	Kevin Love (10)	Darius Garland (10)	Scotiabank Arena; 19,800	41–32
74	March 26	Chicago	L 94–98	Darius Garland (28)	Evan Mobley (11)	Darius Garland (5)	Rocket Mortgage FieldHouse; 19,432	41–33
75	March 28	Orlando	W 107–101	Darius Garland (25)	Dylan Windler (9)	Darius Garland (12)	Rocket Mortgage FieldHouse; 19,432	42–33
76	March 30	Dallas	L 112–120	Caris LeVert (32)	Moses Brown (9)	Darius Garland (10)	Rocket Mortgage FieldHouse; 19,432	42–34
77	March 31	@ Atlanta	L 107–131	Cedi Osman (21)	Moses Brown (13)	Darius Garland (8)	State Farm Arena; 17,491	42–35

April: 2–3 (home: 1–1; road: 1–2)

Game	Date	Team	Score	High points	High rebounds	High assists	Location Attendance	Record
78	April 2	@ New York	W 119–101	Darius Garland (24)	Moses Brown (13)	Darius Garland (13)	Madison Square Garden; 19,812	43–35
79	April 3	Philadelphia	L 108–112	Darius Garland (23)	Moses Brown (12)	Caris LeVert (7)	Rocket Mortgage FieldHouse; 19,432	43–36
80	April 5	@ Orlando	L 115–120	Darius Garland (27)	Kevin Love (13)	Darius Garland (10)	Amway Center; 16,897	43–37
81	April 8	@ Brooklyn	L 107–118	Darius Garland (31)	Kevin Love (9)	Rajon Rondo (5)	Barclays Center; 18,169	43–38
82	April 10	Milwaukee	W 133–115	Kevin Love (32)	Love, Mobley (10)	Rajon Rondo (13)	Rocket Mortgage FieldHouse; 19,432	44–38

2021–22 season schedule

=== Play-in ===
2022 play-in game log
Total: 0–2 (Home: 0–1; Road: 0–1)
Play-in: 0–2 (home: 0–1; road: 0–1)

Game	Date	Team	Score	High points	High rebounds	High assists	Location Attendance	Record
1	April 12	@ Brooklyn	L 108–115	Darius Garland (34)	Kevin Love (13)	Rajon Rondo (9)	Barclays Center; 17,732	0–1
2	April 15	Atlanta	L 101–107	Lauri Markkanen (26)	Markkanen, Mobley (8)	Darius Garland (9)	Rocket Mortgage FieldHouse; 19,432	0–2

2021–22 season schedule

== Player statistics ==
Legend
GP	Games played	GS	Games started	MPG	Minutes per game
FG%	Field-goal percentage	3P%	3-point field-goal percentage	FT%	Free-throw percentage
RPG	Rebounds per game	APG	Assists per game	SPG	Steals per game
BPG	Blocks per game	PPG	Points per game

=== Regular season ===
Player	GP	GS	MPG	FG%	3P%	FT%	RPG	APG	SPG	BPG	PPG
Kevin Love	74	4	22.5	.430	.392	.838	7.2	2.2	.4	.2	13.6
Evan Mobley	69	69	33.8	.508	.250	.663	8.3	2.5	.8	1.7	15.0
Darius Garland	68	68	35.7	.462	.383	.892	3.3	8.6	1.3	.1	21.7
Isaac Okoro	67	61	29.6	.480	.350	.768	3.0	1.8	.8	.3	8.8
Cedi Osman	66	3	22.2	.432	.357	.664	2.2	2.0	.8	.2	10.7
Lamar Stevens	63	13	16.1	.489	.277	.707	2.6	.7	.5	.3	6.1
Lauri Markkanen	61	61	30.8	.445	.358	.868	5.7	1.3	.7	.5	14.8
Jarrett Allen	56	56	32.3	.677	.100	.708	10.8	1.6	.8	1.3	16.1
Dean Wade	51	28	19.2	.456	.359	.667	2.9	1.0	.6	.1	5.3
Dylan Windler	50	0	9.2	.378	.300	.833	1.8	.7	.3	.1	2.2
Brandon Goodwin	36	5	13.9	.416	.345	.632	1.9	2.5	.7	.0	4.8
Ricky Rubio	34	8	28.5	.363	.339	.854	4.1	6.6	1.4	.2	13.1
Ed Davis	31	3	6.5	.688		.429	2.1	.2	.1	.3	.9
Kevin Pangos	24	3	6.9	.326	.231	.750	.5	1.3	.1	.0	1.6
Denzel Valentine^{†}	22	0	9.3	.371	.409		1.7	.5	.3	.0	2.9
Rajon Rondo^{†}	21	1	19.5	.429	.397	.750	2.8	4.9	.9	.0	6.2
Caris LeVert^{†}	19	10	29.8	.435	.313	.745	3.4	3.9	.8	.3	13.6
Moses Brown^{†}	14	5	12.6	.638		.552	5.3	.0	.3	.5	6.4
RJ Nembhard	14	0	4.5	.333	.000	.750	.5	.9	.1	.0	1.1
Collin Sexton	11	11	28.7	.450	.244	.744	3.3	2.1	.9	.0	16.0
Tacko Fall	11	1	5.4	.417		.286	2.1	.2	.0	.5	1.1
Justin Anderson^{†}	3	0	15.7	.500	.333	.750	2.0	2.0	.3	.0	4.3
Luke Kornet^{†}	2	0	7.5	.200	.000	.667	1.5	.5	.0	.5	2.0
Trevon Scott	2	0	5.5	.500	.000		1.0	.0	.5	.5	3.0
Tim Frazier^{†}	2	0	4.0	.500			.0	.5	.0	.0	1.0
Malik Newman	1	0	8.0	.600	.000	1.000	1.0	1.0	.0	.0	8.0

- ^{†} Denotes player spent time with another team in the season. Stats reflect time with the Cavaliers only.

== Transactions ==
=== Trades ===
August 3, 2021	To Cleveland Cavaliers Ricky Rubio	To Minnesota Timberwolves Taurean Prince; 2022 WAS second−round pick Cash considerations
August 28, 2021	To Cleveland Cavaliers Lauri Markkanen	To Portland Trail Blazers Larry Nance Jr.
August 28, 2021	To Chicago Bulls Derrick Jones Jr. 2022 POR protected first-round pick 2023 CLE second-round pick

=== Free agency ===
==== Re-signed ====
Player	Signed
Jarrett Allen	August 6, 2021

==== Additions ====
Player	Signed	Former team
Trevon Scott	September 8, 2021	Salt Lake City Stars
