= 2021–22 New York Knicks season =

Season of National Basketball Association team the New York Knicks

- Head coach: Tom Thibodeau
- President: Leon Rose
- General manager: Scott Perry
- Owners: Madison Square Garden Sports
- Arena: Madison Square Garden

Results
- Record: 37–45 (.451)
- Place: Division: 5th (Atlantic); Conference: 11th (Eastern)
- Playoff finish: Did not qualify
- Stats at Basketball Reference

Local media
- Television: MSG TV
- Radio: WEPN-FM

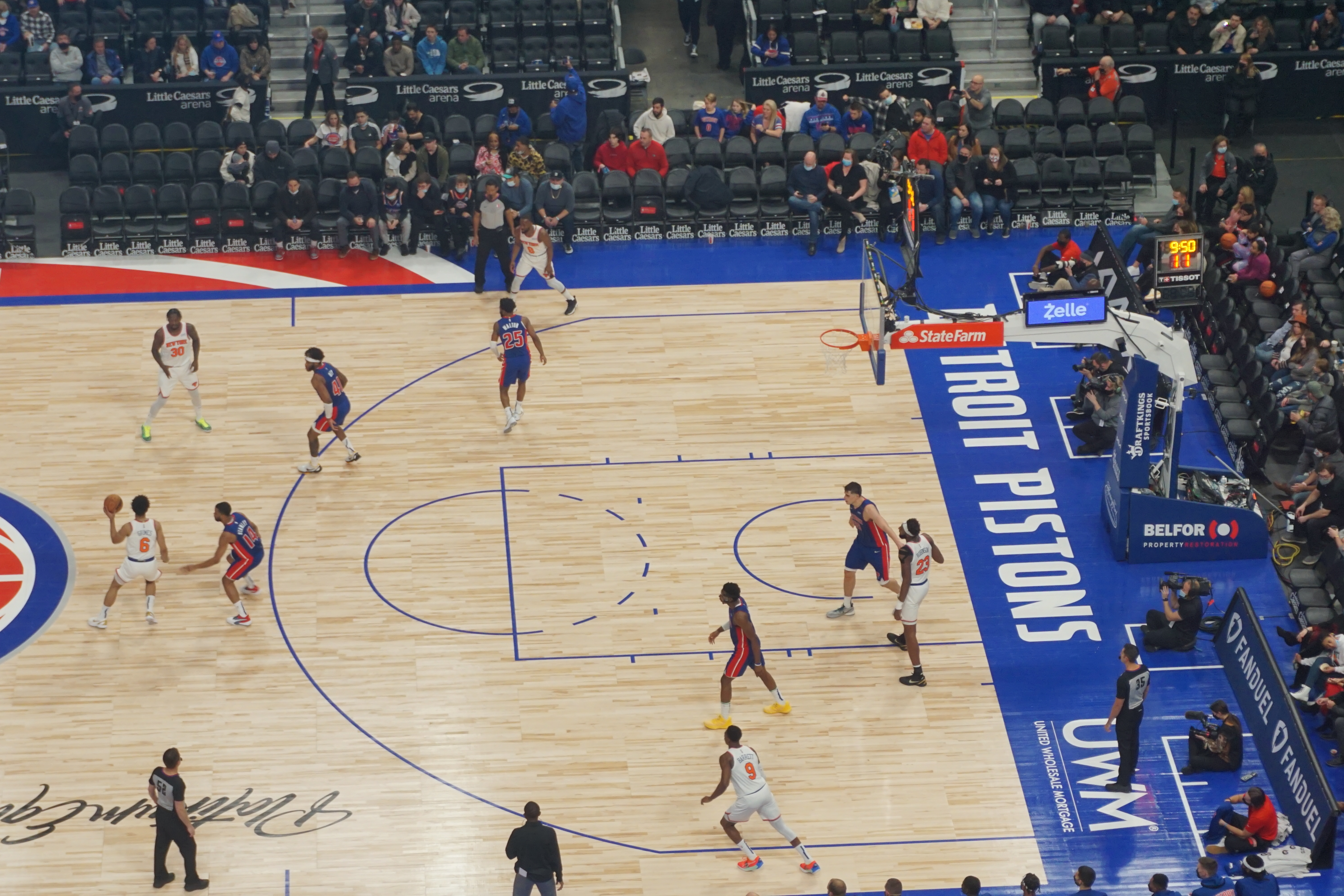
The Knicks in action in Detroit

The 2021–22 New York Knicks season was the 76th season of the franchise in the National Basketball Association (NBA). On March 31, 2022, the Knicks were eliminated from playoff contention after the Atlanta Hawks won against the Cleveland Cavaliers.

== Draft ==
2021 NBA draft picks
Round	Pick	Player	Position	Nationality	School/club
1	19	Kai Jones	C	Bahamas	Texas
1	21	Keon Johnson	SG	United States	Tennessee
2	32	Jeremiah Robinson-Earl	PF	United States	Villanova
2	58	Jericho Sims	PF	United States	Texas

The Knicks entered the draft holding two first-round picks and two second-round picks. The 21st overall pick was acquired on January 31, 2019, in a trade with the Dallas Mavericks. The 32nd overall pick was acquired on February 6, 2020, in a three-team trade with the Los Angeles Clippers and Washington Wizards. The 58th overall pick was acquired on March 25, 2021, in a three-team trade with the Philadelphia 76ers and Oklahoma City Thunder. The Knicks used their 19th overall pick to select Kai Jones, and then selected Keon Johnson (21st overall pick), Jeremiah Robinson-Earl (32nd overall pick) and Jericho Sims (58th overall pick). After getting selected in the draft, Jones was traded to the Charlotte Hornets, Johnson was traded to the Los Angeles Clippers, while Robinson-Earl was traded to the Oklahoma City Thunder.

== Roster ==
2021–22 New York Knicks roster
Players

Pos.	No.	Player	Height	Weight	DOB	From
G	51	Ryan Arcidiacono	6 ft 3 in (1.91 m)	195 lb (88 kg)	1994-03-26	Villanova
G/F	9	RJ Barrett	6 ft 6 in (1.98 m)	214 lb (97 kg)	2000-06-14	Duke
G	18	Alec Burks	6 ft 6 in (1.98 m)	214 lb (97 kg)	1991-07-20	Colorado
G/F	13	Evan Fournier	6 ft 7 in (2.01 m)	205 lb (93 kg)	1992-10-29	France
F	67	Taj Gibson	6 ft 9 in (2.06 m)	232 lb (105 kg)	1985-06-24	USC
G	6	Quentin Grimes	6 ft 5 in (1.96 m)	205 lb (93 kg)	2000-05-08	Houston
F	16	Feron Hunt (TW)	6 ft 8 in (2.03 m)	195 lb (88 kg)	1999-07-05	SMU
G	2	Miles McBride	6 ft 2 in (1.88 m)	200 lb (91 kg)	2000-09-08	West Virginia
F/C	3	Nerlens Noel (injured)	6 ft 11 in (2.11 m)	220 lb (100 kg)	1994-04-10	Kentucky
G	5	Immanuel Quickley	6 ft 3 in (1.91 m)	190 lb (86 kg)	1999-06-17	Kentucky
F	30	Julius Randle	6 ft 8 in (2.03 m)	250 lb (113 kg)	1994-11-29	Kentucky
G/F	21	Cam Reddish (injured)	6 ft 8 in (2.03 m)	217 lb (98 kg)	1999-09-01	Duke
C	23	Mitchell Robinson	7 ft 0 in (2.13 m)	240 lb (109 kg)	1998-04-01	Chalmette HS (LA)
G	4	Derrick Rose (injured)	6 ft 2 in (1.88 m)	200 lb (91 kg)	1988-10-04	Memphis
C	45	Jericho Sims (TW)	6 ft 9 in (2.06 m)	250 lb (113 kg)	1998-10-20	Texas
F	1	Obi Toppin	6 ft 9 in (2.06 m)	220 lb (100 kg)	1998-03-04	Dayton
G	8	Kemba Walker	6 ft 0 in (1.83 m)	184 lb (83 kg)	1990-05-08	Connecticut

Coaches
Head coach
- Tom Thibodeau
Assistant(s)
- Johnnie Bryant (associate HC)
- Darren Erman
- Andy Greer
- Larry Greer
- Kenny Payne

Legend
- (DP) Unsigned draft pick
- (FA) Free agent
- (S) Suspended
- (GL) On assignment to G League affiliate
- (TW) Two-way affiliate player
- Injured

Roster
Updated: April 10, 2022

== Standings ==
=== Division ===
Atlantic Division	W	L	PCT	GB	Home	Road	Div	GP
y – Boston Celtics	51	31	.622	–	28‍–‍13	23‍–‍18	9–7	82
x – Philadelphia 76ers	51	31	.622	–	24‍–‍17	27‍–‍14	6–10	82
x – Toronto Raptors	48	34	.585	3.0	24‍–‍17	24‍–‍17	10–6	82
x − Brooklyn Nets	44	38	.537	7.0	20‍–‍21	24‍–‍17	10–6	82
New York Knicks	37	45	.451	14.0	17‍–‍24	20‍–‍21	5–11	82

=== Conference ===
Eastern Conference
#	Team	W	L	PCT	GB	GP
1	c – Miami Heat *	53	29	.646	–	82
2	y – Boston Celtics *	51	31	.622	2.0	82
3	y – Milwaukee Bucks *	51	31	.622	2.0	82
4	x – Philadelphia 76ers	51	31	.622	2.0	82
5	x – Toronto Raptors	48	34	.585	5.0	82
6	x – Chicago Bulls	46	36	.561	7.0	82
7	x − Brooklyn Nets	44	38	.537	9.0	82
8	pi − Cleveland Cavaliers	44	38	.537	9.0	82
9	x − Atlanta Hawks	43	39	.524	10.0	82
10	pi − Charlotte Hornets	43	39	.524	10.0	82
11	New York Knicks	37	45	.451	16.0	82
12	Washington Wizards	35	47	.427	18.0	82
13	Indiana Pacers	25	57	.305	28.0	82
14	Detroit Pistons	23	59	.280	30.0	82
15	Orlando Magic	22	60	.268	31.0	82

== Game log ==
=== Preseason ===
The preseason schedule was announced on August 24, 2021.

2021 preseason game log
Total: 4–0 (home: 3–0; road: 1–0)
Preseason: 4–0 (home: 3–0; road: 1–0)

Game	Date	Team	Score	High points	High rebounds	High assists	Location Attendance	Record
1	October 5	Indiana	W 125–104	Randle (20)	Randle (9)	Quickley (7)	Madison Square Garden; 10,090	1–0
2	October 9	@ Washington	W 117–99	Barrett (18)	Sims (13)	Rose (8)	Capital One Arena; 8,060	2–0
3	October 13	Detroit	W 108–100	Randle (29)	Randle (11)	Barrett (6)	Madison Square Garden; 11,226	3–0
4	October 15	Washington	W 115–113	Rose (28)	Randle (10)	Rose, Walker (6)	Madison Square Garden; 12,258	4–0

2021–22 preseason schedule

=== Regular season ===
The regular season schedule was released on August 20, 2021.

2021–22 game log
Total: 37–45 (home: 17–24; road: 20–21)
October: 5–1 (home: 2–1; road: 3–0)

Game	Date	Team	Score	High points	High rebounds	High assists	Location Attendance	Record
1	October 20	Boston	W 138–134 (2OT)	Randle (35)	Robinson (17)	Randle (9)	Madison Square Garden; 19,812	1–0
2	October 22	@ Orlando	W 121–96	Randle (21)	Randle (10)	Burks, Randle, Rose (7)	Amway Center; 18,846	2–0
3	October 24	Orlando	L 104–110	Randle (30)	Randle (16)	Barrett (5)	Madison Square Garden; 16,273	2–1
4	October 26	Philadelphia	W 112–99	Walker (19)	Randle (11)	Randle (7)	Madison Square Garden; 15,218	3–1
5	October 28	@ Chicago	W 104–103	Walker (21)	Randle (16)	Randle (9)	United Center; 20,972	4–1
6	October 30	@ New Orleans	W 123–117	Barrett (35)	Barrett (8)	Barrett (6)	Smoothie King Center; 16,508	5–1

November: 6–9 (home: 3–5; road: 3–4)

Game	Date	Team	Score	High points	High rebounds	High assists	Location Attendance	Record
7	November 1	Toronto	L 104–113	Barrett (27)	Robinson (12)	Quickley, Randle (5)	Madison Square Garden; 16,528	5–2
8	November 3	@ Indiana	L 98–111	Barrett (23)	Randle (14)	Walker (4)	Gainbridge Fieldhouse; 11,607	5–3
9	November 5	@ Milwaukee	W 113–98	Randle (32)	Noel (13)	Randle, Rose (4)	Fiserv Forum; 17,341	6–3
10	November 7	Cleveland	L 109–126	Randle (19)	Randle, Robinson (7)	Randle (7)	Madison Square Garden; 19,040	6–4
11	November 8	@ Philadelphia	W 103–96	Randle (31)	Randle (12)	Walker (5)	Wells Fargo Center; 20,224	7–4
12	November 10	Milwaukee	L 100–112	Rose (22)	Gibson (9)	Rose (7)	Madison Square Garden; 18,027	7–5
13	November 12	@ Charlotte	L 96–104	Walker (26)	Burks (9)	Randle (5)	Spectrum Center; 19,257	7–6
14	November 15	Indiana	W 92–84	Quickley, Walker (16)	Randle (11)	Rose (7)	Madison Square Garden; 16,792	8–6
15	November 17	Orlando	L 98–104	Barrett (17)	Robinson (11)	Quickley (7)	Madison Square Garden; 16,680	8–7
16	November 20	Houston	W 106–99	Burks (20)	Randle (10)	Randle (9)	Madison Square Garden; 19,812	9–7
17	November 21	@ Chicago	L 103–109	Randle (34)	Barrett (15)	Walker (4)	United Center; 21,813	9–8
18	November 23	L.A. Lakers	W 106–100	Fournier (26)	Randle (16)	Randle, Walker (5)	Madison Square Garden; 19,812	10–8
19	November 26	Phoenix	L 97–118	Walker (17)	Robinson (8)	Quickley, Randle (4)	Madison Square Garden; 19,812	10–9
20	November 27	@ Atlanta	W 99–90	Burks (23)	Randle, Robinson (11)	Quickley (7)	State Farm Arena; 17,287	11–9
21	November 30	@ Brooklyn	L 110–112	Burks (25)	Randle (9)	Rose (9)	Barclays Center; 18,081	11–10

December: 6–9 (home: 2–5; road: 4–4)

Game	Date	Team	Score	High points	High rebounds	High assists	Location Attendance	Record
22	December 2	Chicago	L 115–119	Randle (30)	Randle (12)	Randle, Rose (6)	Madison Square Garden; 19,812	11–11
23	December 4	Denver	L 99–113	Randle (24)	Toppin (8)	Randle (8)	Madison Square Garden; 18,272	11–12
24	December 7	@ San Antonio	W 121–109	Barrett (32)	Robinson (14)	Randle (8)	AT&T Center; 14,698	12–12
25	December 8	@ Indiana	L 102–122	Barrett (19)	Randle (8)	Rose (7)	Gainbridge Fieldhouse; 13,167	12–13
26	December 10	@ Toronto	L 87–90	Barrett (19)	Randle (14)	Burks, Randle (5)	Scotiabank Arena; 19,800	12–14
27	December 12	Milwaukee	L 97–112	Grimes (27)	Randle (10)	Randle, Rose (7)	Madison Square Garden; 19,812	12–15
28	December 14	Golden State	L 96–105	Randle (31)	Knox, Noel, Randle (7)	Rose (6)	Madison Square Garden; 19,812	12–16
29	December 16	@ Houston	W 116–103	Quickley (24)	Burks, Robinson (9)	McBride (9)	Toyota Center; 13,857	13–16
30	December 18	@ Boston	L 107–114	Fournier (32)	Randle (9)	Randle (7)	TD Garden; 19,156	13–17
31	December 21	Detroit	W 105–91	Fournier (22)	Robinson (14)	Burks (6)	Madison Square Garden; 17,906	14–17
32	December 23	Washington	L 117–124	Walker (44)	Randle, Walker (9)	Walker (8)	Madison Square Garden; 18,208	14–18
33	December 25	Atlanta	W 101–87	Randle (25)	Randle (12)	Walker (12)	Madison Square Garden; 19,812	15–18
34	December 28	@ Minnesota	W 96–88	Robinson (14)	Robinson (18)	Quickley (4)	Target Center; 16,339	16–18
35	December 29	@ Detroit	W 94–85	Burks (34)	Randle (10)	Randle (5)	Little Caesars Arena; 18,312	17–18
36	December 31	@ Oklahoma City	L 80–95	Barrett (26)	Robinson (12)	Barrett, Fournier (3)	Paycom Center; 16,451	17–19

January: 7–8 (home: 6–3; road: 1–5)

Game	Date	Team	Score	High points	High rebounds	High assists	Location Attendance	Record
37	January 2	@ Toronto	L 105–120	Fournier (20)	Gibson (7)	Toppin (6)	Scotiabank Arena; No in-person attendance	17–20
38	January 4	Indiana	W 104–94	Barrett (32)	Randle (16)	Burks, Randle (4)	Madison Square Garden; 18,449	18–20
39	January 6	Boston	W 108–105	Fournier (41)	Burks (9)	Burks (7)	Madison Square Garden; 17,529	19–20
40	January 8	@ Boston	L 75–99	Barrett (19)	Randle (12)	Randle (6)	TD Garden; 19,156	19–21
41	January 10	San Antonio	W 111–96	Barrett (31)	Randle (12)	Grimes, Quickley (6)	Madison Square Garden; 16,569	20–21
42	January 12	Dallas	W 108–85	Barrett (32)	Randle (12)	Randle (8)	Madison Square Garden; 18,215	21–21
43	January 15	@ Atlanta	W 117–108	Barrett (26)	Robinson (13)	Randle (9)	State Farm Arena; 16,414	22–21
44	January 17	Charlotte	L 87–97	Barrett, Randle (18)	Barrett (12)	Quickley (7)	Madison Square Garden; 19,812	22–22
45	January 18	Minnesota	L 110–112	Fournier (27)	Randle (9)	Randle (9)	Madison Square Garden; 16,071	22–23
46	January 20	New Orleans	L 91–102	Barrett, Robinson (17)	Robinson (15)	Randle (6)	Madison Square Garden; 16,168	22–24
47	January 23	L.A. Clippers	W 110–102	Barrett (28)	Barrett (14)	Barrett, Quickley (6)	Madison Square Garden; 19,812	23–24
48	January 24	@ Cleveland	L 93–95	Barrett (24)	Noel (13)	Quickley (6)	Rocket Mortgage FieldHouse; 17,321	23–25
49	January 26	@ Miami	L 96–110	Toppin (18)	Robinson (10)	Quickley (7)	FTX Arena; 19,600	23–26
50	January 28	@ Milwaukee	L 108–123	Fournier (25)	Randle (11)	Walker (7)	Fiserv Forum; 17,341	23–27
51	January 31	Sacramento	W 116–96	Burks (21)	Robinson (13)	Noel (5)	Madison Square Garden; 15,925	24–27

February: 1–9 (home: 0–5; road: 1–4)

Game	Date	Team	Score	High points	High rebounds	High assists	Location Attendance	Record
52	February 2	Memphis	L 108–120	Fournier (30)	Randle (12)	Randle (9)	Madison Square Garden; 19,812	24–28
53	February 5	@ L.A. Lakers	L 115–122 (OT)	Barrett (36)	Randle (16)	Randle (7)	Crypto.com Arena; 18,997	24–29
54	February 7	@ Utah	L 104–113	Randle (30)	Robinson (21)	Barrett (6)	Vivint Arena; 18,306	24–30
55	February 8	@ Denver	L 115–132	Randle (28)	Randle (10)	Walker (8)	Ball Arena; 15,093	24–31
56	February 10	@ Golden State	W 116–114	Randle (28)	Randle (16)	Randle (7)	Chase Center; 18,064	25–31
57	February 12	@ Portland	L 103–112	Randle (28)	Randle (16)	Randle (6)	Moda Center; 18,521	25–32
58	February 14	Oklahoma City	L 123–127 (OT)	Randle (30)	Robinson (17)	Randle (10)	Madison Square Garden; 18,433	25–33
59	February 16	Brooklyn	L 106–111	Randle (31)	Randle (10)	Burks (5)	Madison Square Garden; 18,916	25–34
60	February 25	Miami	L 100–115	Barrett (46)	Barrett, Robinson (9)	Randle (8)	Madison Square Garden; 19,812	25–35
61	February 27	Philadelphia	L 109–125	Barrett, Fournier (24)	Randle, Sims (10)	Randle (7)	Madison Square Garden; 19,812	25–36

March: 9–7 (home: 3–3; road: 6–4)

Game	Date	Team	Score	High points	High rebounds	High assists	Location Attendance	Record
62	March 2	@ Philadelphia	L 108–123	Barrett (30)	Burks, Robinson (7)	Barrett (7)	Wells Fargo Center; 21,333	25–37
63	March 4	@ Phoenix	L 114–115	Randle (25)	Robinson (15)	Burks (6)	Footprint Center; 17,071	25–38
64	March 6	@ L.A. Clippers	W 116–93	Barrett (24)	Robinson, Sims (11)	Quickley (6)	Crypto.com Arena; 17,422	26–38
65	March 7	@ Sacramento	W 131–115	Randle (46)	Randle (10)	Barrett (6)	Golden 1 Center; 14,720	27–38
66	March 9	@ Dallas	W 107–77	Randle (26)	Burks, Robinson (11)	Quickley (6)	American Airlines Center; 20,182	28–38
67	March 11	@ Memphis	L 114–118	Randle (36)	Robinson (16)	Randle (6)	FedExForum; 17,188	28–39
68	March 13	@ Brooklyn	L 107–110	Randle (26)	Sims (10)	Burks (7)	Barclays Center; 18,057	28–40
69	March 16	Portland	W 128–98	Barrett (31)	Randle (9)	Randle (7)	Madison Square Garden; 18,213	29–40
70	March 18	Washington	W 100–97	Barrett, Randle (18)	Randle (17)	Quickley (5)	Madison Square Garden; 19,812	30–40
71	March 20	Utah	L 93–108	Barrett (24)	Randle (11)	Quickley (4)	Madison Square Garden; 19,812	30–41
72	March 22	Atlanta	L 111–117	Barrett (30)	Barrett (13)	Burks, Fournier (4)	Madison Square Garden; 19,812	30–42
73	March 23	@ Charlotte	W 121–106	Barrett (30)	Toppin (11)	Fournier, Quickley (7)	Spectrum Center; 16,290	31–42
74	March 25	@ Miami	W 111–103	Quickley (23)	Barrett, Toppin (8)	McBride (5)	FTX Arena; 19,600	32–42
75	March 27	@ Detroit	W 104–102	Barrett (21)	Barrett, Robinson (9)	Randle (5)	Little Caesars Arena; 19,304	33–42
76	March 28	Chicago	W 109–104	Barrett (28)	Randle (13)	Quickley, Randle (4)	Madison Square Garden; 19,812	34–42
77	March 30	Charlotte	L 114–125	Fournier (30)	Burks (12)	Randle (7)	Madison Square Garden; 19,812	34–43

April: 3–2 (home: 1–2; road: 2–0)

Game	Date	Team	Score	High points	High rebounds	High assists	Location Attendance	Record
78	April 2	Cleveland	L 101–119	Toppin (20)	Quickley (7)	Quickley (7)	Madison Square Garden; 19,812	34–44
79	April 3	@ Orlando	W 118–88	Barrett (27)	Quickley, Robinson (10)	Quickley (10)	Amway Center; 15,747	35–44
80	April 6	Brooklyn	L 98–110	Burks (24)	Sims (13)	Barrett (7)	Madison Square Garden; 19,812	35–45
81	April 8	@ Washington	W 114–92	Toppin (35)	Sims (9)	Quickley (10)	Capital One Arena; 19,472	36–45
82	April 10	Toronto	W 105–94	Toppin (42)	Sims (14)	Quickley (12)	Madison Square Garden; 19,812	37–45

2021–22 season schedule

== Player statistics ==
Legend
GP	Games played	GS	Games started	MPG	Minutes per game
FG%	Field-goal percentage	3P%	3-point field-goal percentage	FT%	Free-throw percentage
RPG	Rebounds per game	APG	Assists per game	SPG	Steals per game
BPG	Blocks per game	PPG	Points per game

=== Regular season statistics ===
As of April 10, 2022

New York Knicks statistics
Player	GP	GS	MPG	FG%	3P%	FT%	RPG	APG	SPG	BPG	PPG
Ryan Arcidiacono	10	0	7.6	.500	.444	—	.8	.4	.1	.0	1.6
RJ Barrett	70	70	34.5	.408	.342	.714	5.8	3.0	.6	.2	20.0
Alec Burks	81	44	28.6	.391	.404	.822	4.9	3.0	1.0	.3	11.7
Damyean Dotson	2	0	10.5	.500	.000	—	1.0	.5	.0	.0	2.0
Evan Fournier	80	80	29.5	.417	.389	.708	2.6	2.1	1.0	.3	14.1
Taj Gibson	52	4	18.2	.518	.395	.808	4.4	.6	.4	.8	4.4
Quentin Grimes	46	6	17.1	.404	.381	.684	2.0	1.0	.7	.2	6.0
Tyler Hall	1	0	2.0	—	—	—	.0	.0	.0	.0	.0
Danuel House	1	0	3.0	.000	.000	—	.0	.0	.0	.0	.0
Feron Hunt	2	0	4.0	.000	—	—	.5	.5	.5	.0	.0
Kevin Knox II	13	0	8.5	.375	.357	.700	1.7	.2	.2	.1	3.6
Miles McBride	40	2	9.3	.296	.250	.667	1.1	1.0	.4	.0	2.2
Matt Mooney	1	0	2.0	.000	.000	—	.0	.0	1.0	.0	.0
Nerlens Noel	25	11	22.5	.533	.000	.700	5.6	.9	1.2	1.2	3.4
Immanuel Quickley	78	3	23.1	.392	.346	.881	3.2	3.5	.7	.0	11.3
Julius Randle	72	72	35.3	.411	.308	.756	9.9	5.1	.7	.5	20.1
Cam Reddish	15	0	14.3	.415	.258	.906	1.4	.7	.8	.3	6.1
Mitchell Robinson	72	62	25.7	.761	—	.486	8.6	.5	.8	1.8	8.5
Derrick Rose	26	4	24.5	.445	.402	.968	3.0	4.0	.8	.5	12.0
Wayne Selden Jr.	3	0	6.3	.250	.500	.500	.3	.3	.0	.0	1.7
Jericho Sims	41	5	13.5	.722	—	.414	4.1	.5	.3	.5	2.2
Obi Toppin	72	10	17.1	.531	.308	.758	3.7	1.1	.3	.5	9.0
Kemba Walker	37	37	25.6	.403	.367	.845	3.0	3.5	.7	.2	11.6

== Transactions ==
=== Trades ===
July 29, 2021	To New York Knicks Protected future first-round pick	To Charlotte Hornets Draft rights to Kai Jones
July 29, 2021	To New York Knicks Draft rights to Quentin Grimes; 2024 second-round pick	To Los Angeles Clippers Draft rights to Keon Johnson
July 29, 2021	To New York Knicks Draft rights to Rokas Jokubaitis; Draft rights to Miles McBride	To Oklahoma City Thunder Draft rights to Jeremiah Robinson-Earl
August 17, 2021	To New York Knicks Evan Fournier; Conditional 2022 second-round pick 2023 second-round pick	To Boston Celtics Cash considerations
January 3, 2022	To New York Knicks Denzel Valentine; Draft rights to Brad Newley; Draft rights to Wang Zhelin; Cash considerations	To Cleveland Cavaliers Rajon Rondo
January 3, 2022	To Los Angeles Lakers Draft rights to Louis Labeyrie	
January 13, 2022	To New York Knicks Solomon Hill; Cam Reddish; 2025 second-round pick Cash considerations	To Atlanta Hawks Kevin Knox II; Protected future first-round pick

=== Additions ===
Date	Player	Former team	Ref
August 11, 2021	Kemba Walker	Boston Celtics	
August 19, 2021	Dwayne Bacon	Orlando Magic	
August 19, 2021	Aamir Simms	Clemson Tigers	
August 20, 2021	M. J. Walker	Florida State Seminoles	
September 25, 2021	Wayne Selden Jr.	Ironi Ness Ziona	
October 8, 2021	Tyler Hall	Westchester Knicks	
October 12, 2021	Myles Powell	Westchester Knicks	
October 14, 2021	Brandon Goodwin	Atlanta Hawks	
October 16, 2021	Brandon Knight	Detroit Pistons	
October 16, 2021	Luka Šamanić	San Antonio Spurs	
December 18, 2021	Tyler Hall	Westchester Knicks	
December 21, 2021	Damyean Dotson	Austin Spurs	
December 21, 2021	Matt Mooney	Capitanes de la Ciudad de México	
December 23, 2021	Danuel House	Houston Rockets	
December 31, 2021	Damyean Dotson	—	
December 31, 2021	Matt Mooney	—	
January 6, 2022	Ryan Arcidiacono	Maine Celtics	
January 19, 2022	Ryan Arcidiacono	—	
February 13, 2022	Ryan Arcidiacono	—	
March 18, 2022	Feron Hunt	Texas Legends	

=== Subtractions ===
Date	Player	New team	Ref
July 31, 2021	Norvel Pelle	Cleveland Charge	
August 6, 2021	Reggie Bullock	Dallas Mavericks	
August 10, 2021	Elfrid Payton	Phoenix Suns	
September 16, 2021	Frank Ntilikina	Dallas Mavericks	
September 24, 2021	Jared Harper	New Orleans Pelicans	
September 28, 2021	Theo Pinson	Boston Celtics	
October 3, 2021	Luca Vildoza	Milwaukee Bucks	
October 12, 2021	Tyler Hall	Westchester Knicks	
October 14, 2021	Dwayne Bacon	AS Monaco Basket	
October 14, 2021	Myles Powell	Westchester Knicks	
October 15, 2021	Brandon Goodwin	Westchester Knicks	
October 16, 2021	Brandon Knight	Sioux Falls Skyforce	
October 16, 2021	Aamir Simms	Westchester Knicks	
October 16, 2021	M. J. Walker	Westchester Knicks	
January 3, 2022	Wayne Selden Jr.	Afyon Belediye	
January 3, 2022	Denzel Valentine	Utah Jazz	
January 2, 2022	Tyler Hall	Westchester Knicks	
January 6, 2022	Danuel House	Utah Jazz	
January 11, 2022	Damyean Dotson	Austin Spurs	
January 31, 2022	Ryan Arcidiacono	Maine Celtics	
March 17, 2022	Luka Šamanić	Boston Celtics	
