= Jalen Smith =

American basketball player (born 2000)

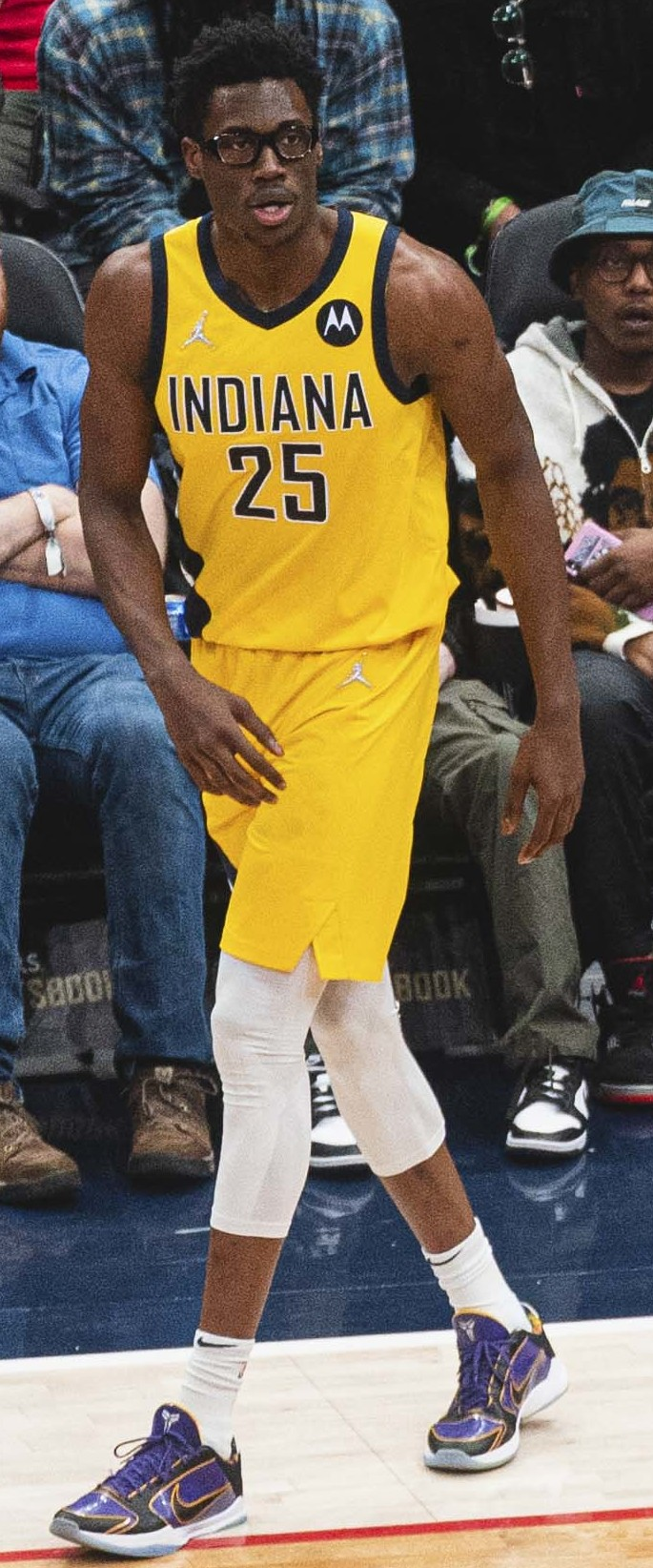
- Smith with the Indiana Pacers in 2022

No. 25 – Chicago Bulls
- Position: Power forward / center
- League: NBA

Personal information
- Born: March 16, 2000 (age 26) Portsmouth, Virginia, U.S.
- Listed height: 6 ft 9 in (2.06 m)
- Listed weight: 244 lb (111 kg)

Career information
- High school: Mount Saint Joseph (Baltimore, Maryland)
- College: Maryland (2018–2020)
- NBA draft: 2020: 1st round, 10th overall pick
- Drafted by: Phoenix Suns
- Playing career: 2020–present

Career history
- 2020–2022: Phoenix Suns
- 2021: →Agua Caliente Clippers
- 2022–2024: Indiana Pacers
- 2024–present: Chicago Bulls

Career highlights
- Third-team All-American – AP, SN, USBWA, NABC (2020); First-team All-Big Ten (2020); Big Ten All-Defensive Team (2020); Big Ten All-Freshman team (2019); McDonald's All-American (2018); 2× Maryland Gatorade Player of the Year (2017, 2018)
- Stats at NBA.com
- Stats at Basketball Reference

Jalen Rasheed Smith (born March 16, 2000) is an American professional basketball player for the Chicago Bulls of the National Basketball Association (NBA). Nicknamed "Stix", he played college basketball for the Maryland Terrapins.

Smith was picked 10th overall in the 2020 NBA draft by the Phoenix Suns. During his rookie season with the Suns, he reached the NBA Finals. In February 2022, he was traded to the Indiana Pacers.

== Early life ==
Smith was born in Portsmouth, Virginia to Charles and Orletha Smith. Smith attended Mount Saint Joseph High School in Baltimore, Maryland where he averaged 22.2 points, 12.0 rebounds, and 4.0 blocks per game as a senior and won several awards, among them, the Gatorade Maryland Boys Basketball Player of the Year twice. He was named to the 2018 McDonald's All-American team.

Smith was ranked among the top 25 prospects of the 2018 recruiting class by Rivals, 247Sports, and ESPN. He was also ranked as one of the top prospects at his position by all three scouting services.

College recruiting
Name	Hometown	School	Height	Weight	Commit date
Jalen Smith; PF	Baltimore, MD	Mount Saint Joseph (MD)	6 ft 10 in (2.08 m)	198 lb (90 kg)	Jun 26, 2017
Jalen Smith; PF	Recruit ratings: Rivals: 247Sports: ESPN: (93)				
Overall recruit ranking: Rivals: 24 247Sports: 15 ESPN: 10
Note: In many cases, Scout, Rivals, 247Sports, On3, and ESPN may conflict in their listings of height and weight.; In these cases, the average was taken. ESPN grades are on a 100-point scale.; Sources: "Maryland 2018 Basketball Commitments". Rivals.; "2018 Maryland Terrapins Recruiting Class". ESPN.; "2018 Team Ranking". Rivals.

== College career ==
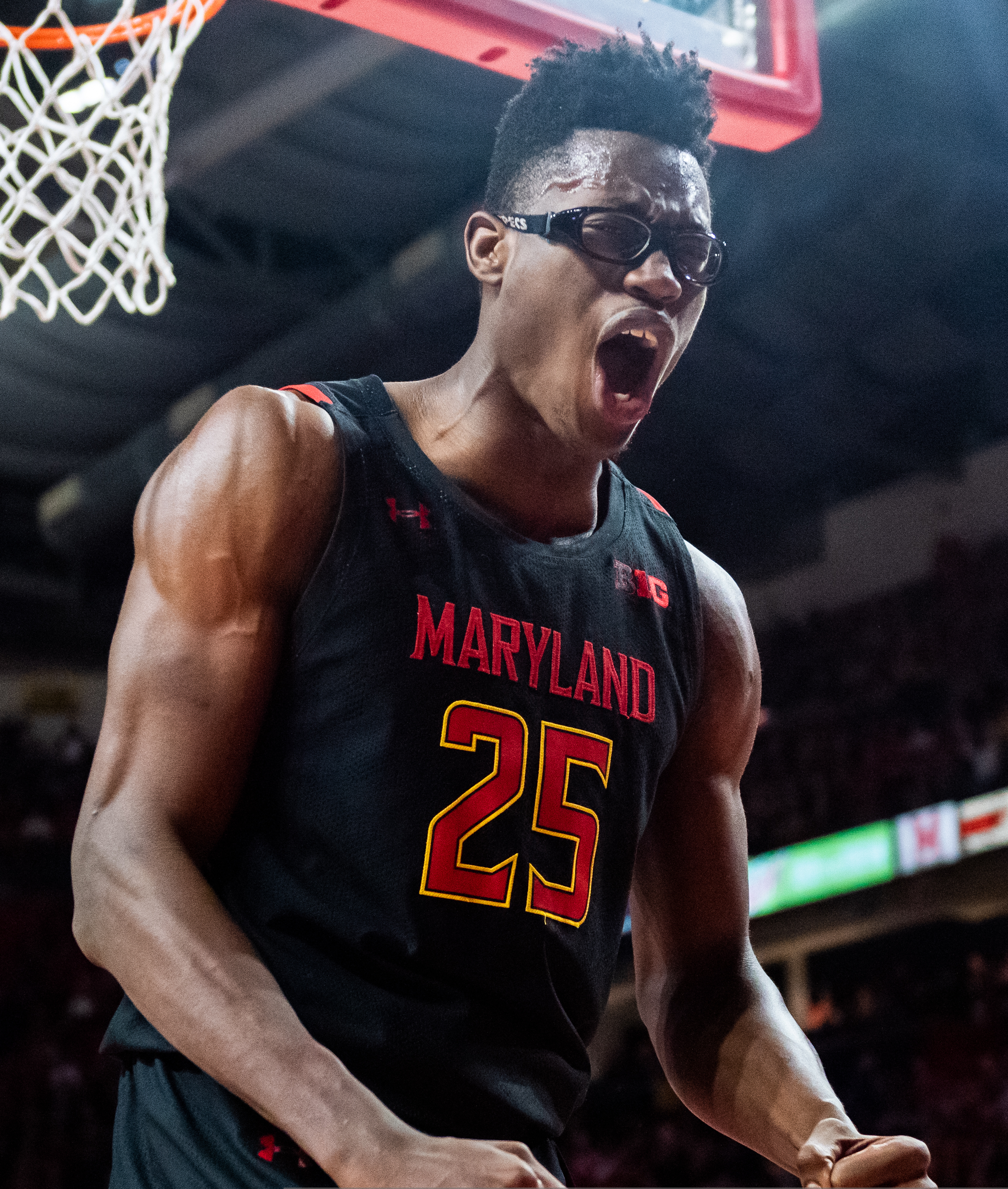
Smith with Maryland in 2020

On November 8, 2017, Smith signed his National Letter of Intent to play for Maryland after verbally committing in June. He selected Maryland over programs such as Villanova and Virginia. As a freshman, he averaged 11.7 points, 6.8 rebounds and 1.2 blocks per game. He had 19 points and 12 rebounds in a 79–77 win over Belmont in the Round of 64 of the NCAA Tournament. In the next game, a 69–67 loss to LSU, Smith finished with 15 points, eight rebounds and a career-high five blocks.

On December 4, 2019, Smith finished with 15 points and a career-high 16 rebounds in a 72–51 win against Notre Dame. On January 21, 2020, Smith scored a career-high 25 points and had 11 rebounds in a come-from-behind 77–66 win over Northwestern. At the close of the regular season, Smith was named to the first-team All-Big Ten by the coaches and media and the Defensive Team by the coaches. He was named third-team All-American by the Associated Press and The Sporting News. He averaged 15.5 points, 10.5 rebounds, and 2.4 blocks per game as a sophomore. After the season, Smith declared for the 2020 NBA draft.

== Professional career ==
=== Phoenix Suns (2020–2022) ===
Smith was selected by the Phoenix Suns with the 10th pick in the first round of the 2020 NBA draft. On November 24, 2020, the Phoenix Suns announced that they had signed Smith.

On February 15, 2021, due to the team's success and after appearing in only eight games, the Suns assigned Smith to the Agua Caliente Clippers of the NBA G League. On February 26, 2021, the Suns recalled Smith. Smith ended his rookie season by making the NBA Finals, but the Suns were defeated in six games by the Milwaukee Bucks, as well as future Pacers teammate Jordan Nwora.

=== Indiana Pacers (2022–2024) ===
On February 10, 2022, Smith was traded to the Indiana Pacers along with a future second-round draft pick (Hugo Besson) in exchange for Torrey Craig.

On July 1, 2022, Smith re-signed with the Pacers on a two-year deal worth $9.6 million. After the signing, Pacers head coach Rick Carlisle announced Smith would be a starter and considered him an "important part of our future." On November 18, Smith posted a career–high 18 rebounds to go along with 10 points and 3 blocks in a win over the Houston Rockets. On November 27, Smith recorded a career–high 23 points on 8–14 shooting along with 9 rebounds in a loss to the Los Angeles Clippers. Starting in December, Smith would move in and out of the starting lineup, alongside Aaron Nesmith, for the remainder of the 2022–23 season.

Smith earned the backup center role behind Myles Turner for the 2023–24 season. On November 8, 2023, he recorded his first double–double of the season with 16 points, 11 rebounds, 2 steals, and a block, on 5–8 shooting from the field in a win over the Utah Jazz.

=== Chicago Bulls (2024–present) ===
On July 8, 2024, Smith signed with the Chicago Bulls on a three-year, $27 million contract. He made 64 appearances (including two starts) for Chicago during the 2024–25 season, averaging 8.2 points, 5.6 rebounds, and 1.0 assist.

Smith played in 53 appearances (including 21 starts) for the Bulls in the 2025–26 season, posting averages of 10.2 points, 6.7 rebounds, and 1.2 assists. On March 26, 2026, Smith was ruled out for the remainder of the season due to a right calf injury.

== Career statistics ==
Legend
GP	Games played	GS	Games started	MPG	Minutes per game
FG%	Field goal percentage	3P%	3-point field goal percentage	FT%	Free throw percentage
RPG	Rebounds per game	APG	Assists per game	SPG	Steals per game
BPG	Blocks per game	PPG	Points per game	**Bold**	Career high

=== NBA ===
==== Regular season ====
Year	Team	GP	GS	MPG	FG%	3P%	FT%	RPG	APG	SPG	BPG	PPG
2020–21	Phoenix	27	1	5.8	.440	.235	.714	1.4	.1	.0	.2	2.0
2021–22	Phoenix	29	4	13.2	.460	.231	.769	4.8	.2	.2	.6	6.0
2021–22	Indiana	22	4	**24.7**	.531	.373	.760	**7.6**	.8	.4	**1.0**	**13.4**
2022–23	Indiana	**68**	**31**	18.8	.476	.283	.759	5.8	1.0	.3	.9	9.4
2023–24	Indiana	61	14	17.2	**.592**	**.424**	.692	5.5	1.0	.3	.6	9.9
2024–25	Chicago	64	2	15.0	.466	.324	**.809**	5.6	1.0	.3	.7	8.2
2025–26	Chicago	53	21	20.7	.483	.373	.742	6.7	**1.2**	**.5**	.8	10.2
Career		324	77	16.9	.501	.342	.752	5.5	.9	.3	.7	8.7

==== Playoffs ====
Year	Team	GP	GS	MPG	FG%	3P%	FT%	RPG	APG	SPG	BPG	PPG
2021	Phoenix	6	0	2.9	**.500**	**1.000**	—	.8	.2	.0	.0	.8
2024	Indiana	**7**	0	**6.0**	.375	.500	.625	**2.0**	**.3**	**.3**	**.1**	**1.9**
Career		13	0	4.6	.417	.600	.625	1.5	.2	.2	.1	1.4

=== College ===
Year	Team	GP	GS	MPG	FG%	3P%	FT%	RPG	APG	SPG	BPG	PPG
2018–19	Maryland	**33**	**33**	26.7	.492	.268	.658	6.8	**.9**	.4	1.2	11.7
2019–20	Maryland	31	31	**31.3**	**.538**	**.368**	**.750**	**10.5**	.8	**.7**	**2.4**	**15.5**
Career		64	64	28.9	.516	.323	.709	8.6	.8	.6	1.8	13.5

== Personal life ==
His father, Charles, is a retired Navy Chief. In college Smith went by the nickname, "Stix", though after bulking up for the 2019–20 season, he was then referred to as "Logs" by head coach Mark Turgeon.
