= Precious Achiuwa =

Nigerian basketball player (born 1999)

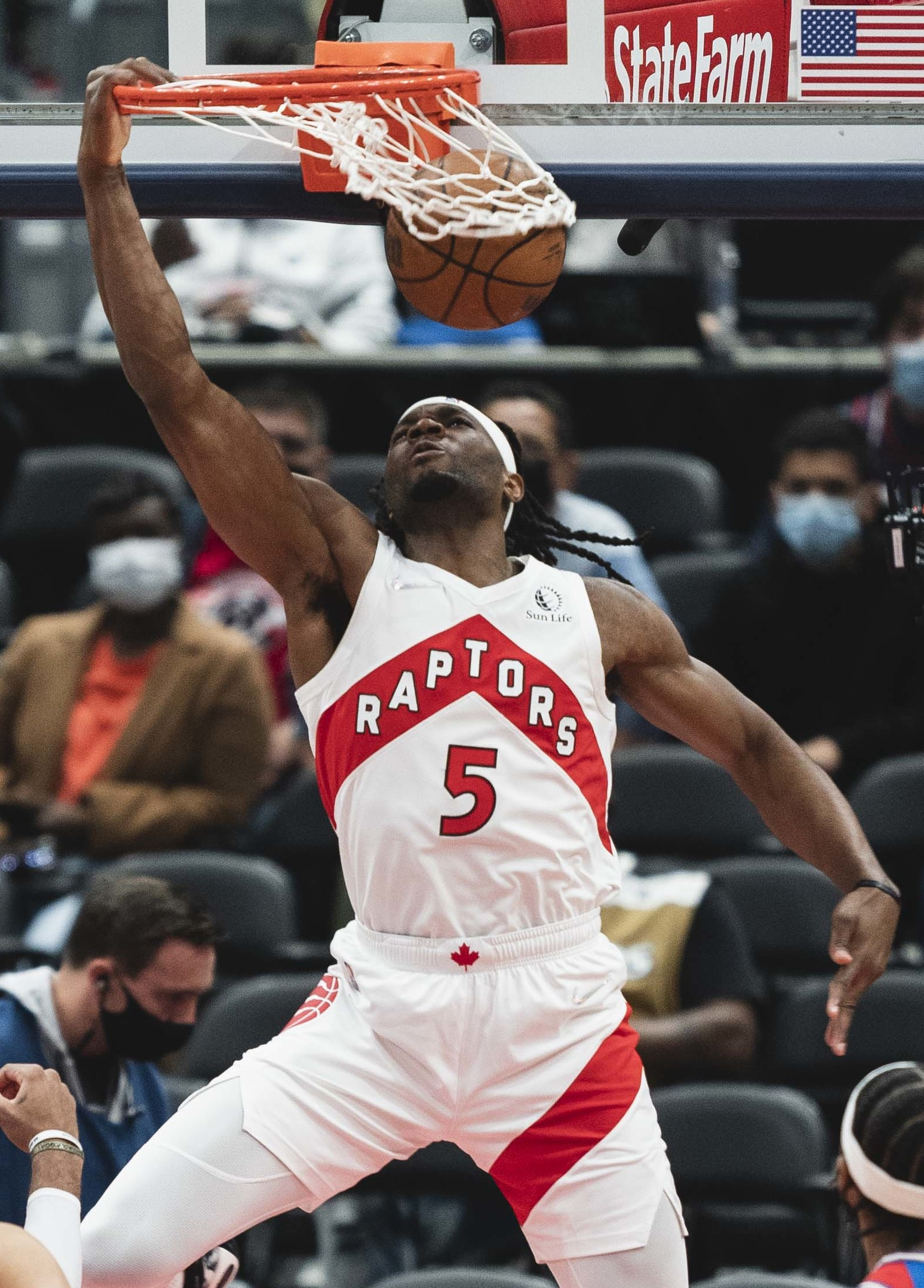
- Achiuwa with the Toronto Raptors in 2021

No. 9 – Sacramento Kings
- Position: Power forward
- League: NBA

Personal information
- Born: September 19, 1999 (age 27) Port Harcourt, Rivers State, Nigeria
- Listed height: 6 ft 8 in (2.03 m)
- Listed weight: 243 lb (110 kg)

Career information
- High school: Our Saviour Lutheran School (The Bronx, New York); St. Benedict's Prep (Newark, New Jersey); Montverde Academy (Montverde, Florida)
- College: Memphis (2019–2020)
- NBA draft: 2020: 1st round, 20th overall pick
- Drafted by: Miami Heat
- Playing career: 2020–present

Career history
- 2020–2021: Miami Heat
- 2021–2023: Toronto Raptors
- 2023–2025: New York Knicks
- 2025–present: Sacramento Kings

Career highlights
- AAC Player of the Year (2020); First-team All-AAC (2020); AAC Freshman of the Year (2020); McDonald's All-American (2019)
- Stats at NBA.com
- Stats at Basketball Reference

Precious Ezinna Achiuwa (born September 19, 1999) is a Nigerian professional basketball player for the Sacramento Kings of the National Basketball Association (NBA). He attended high school in the United States, where he was a consensus five-star recruit and named a McDonald's All-American. Achiuwa played college basketball for the Memphis Tigers, earning conference player of the year honors as a freshman in the American Athletic Conference (AAC) in 2020. He was selected by the Miami Heat in the first round of the 2020 NBA draft with the 20th overall pick. After his rookie year ended in Miami, he was traded to the Toronto Raptors during the 2021 offseason before being traded to the New York Knicks in 2023. He later returned to the Heat in 2025. He was waived by the Heat after the preseason but signed with the Sacramento Kings in November.

== Early life ==
Achiuwa was born in Port Harcourt, Nigeria, to Nigerian parents of Igbo descent and grew up mainly playing soccer. He started focusing on basketball while in eighth grade, when he moved to the United States. Achiuwa and his family settled in Queens, New York. As a high school freshman, Achiuwa played basketball for Our Saviour Lutheran School in The Bronx, New York. For his next two years, he attended St. Benedict's Preparatory School in Newark, New Jersey. The school had a nationally ranked basketball program and he was teammates with several NCAA Division I recruits. In his junior season, Achiuwa averaged 18.5 points, 10.5 rebounds, 2.9 blocks, and 2.2 steals per game, leading his team to a 28–2 record. He was named to the MaxPreps Junior All-American second team.

Entering his senior year, Achiuwa transferred to Montverde Academy, a prep school in Montverde, Florida with a successful basketball program that held the No. 1 national ranking in the previous season. He led Montverde with 14 points and 7.2 rebounds per game and helped his team reach the semifinals at GEICO High School Nationals. Achiuwa earned MaxPreps All-American fifth team, USA Today All-USA third team, and USA Today All-USA Florida first team honors. On March 27, 2019, he played for the East team in the McDonald's All-American Game, leading all scorers with 22 points. On April 12, Achiuwa joined the World team at the Nike Hoop Summit.

On May 17, 2019, Achiuwa committed to play college basketball for Memphis under head coach Penny Hardaway. He joined his former Amateur Athletic Union (AAU) teammate, Lester Quinones, and the number one player in the 2019 class, James Wiseman.

College recruiting
Name	Hometown	School	Height	Weight	Commit date
Precious Achiuwa; PF/ C	The Bronx, New York	Montverde Academy (FL)	6 ft 9 in (2.06 m)	225 lb (102 kg)	May 17, 2019
Precious Achiuwa; PF/ C	Recruit ratings: Rivals: 247Sports: ESPN: (95)				
Overall recruit ranking: Rivals: 17 247Sports: 9 ESPN: 17
Note: In many cases, Scout, Rivals, 247Sports, On3, and ESPN may conflict in their listings of height and weight.; In these cases, the average was taken. ESPN grades are on a 100-point scale.; Sources: "Memphis 2019 Basketball Commitments". Rivals.; "2019 Memphis Tigers Recruiting Class". ESPN.; "2019 Team Ranking". Rivals.

== College career ==
In his debut for Memphis, Achiuwa had 14 points and eight rebounds as the Tigers defeated South Carolina State 97–64. Achiuwa scored a season-high 25 points in an 87–86 win over Ole Miss on November 23. As a result, he was named American Athletic Conference player of the week on November 25. He earned conference freshman of the week honors on December 23 after recording 20 points and nine rebounds in a 77–49 victory over Jackson State. At the conclusion of the regular season, Achiuwa was named AAC Player and Freshman of the Year. He averaged 15.8 points, 10.8 rebounds and 1.9 blocks per game as a freshman. He declared for the 2020 NBA draft after his freshman season.

== Professional career ==
=== Miami Heat (2020–2021) ===
Achiuwa was selected with the 20th pick in the 2020 NBA draft by the Miami Heat. On November 25, 2020, Achiuwa signed his rookie scale contract with the Heat. He made 61 appearances (including four starts) for Miami during the 2020–21 NBA season, averaging 5.0 points, 3.4 rebounds, and 0.5 assists.

=== Toronto Raptors (2021–2023) ===
On August 6, 2021, the Toronto Raptors acquired Achiuwa and Goran Dragić from the Heat via a sign-and-trade deal in exchange for Kyle Lowry. On October 20, on his season debut with the Raptors, Achiuwa had eight points, six rebounds, two assists and a steal in 39 minutes of play in a 96–83 loss to the Washington Wizards. On November 24, Achiuwa made a career-high three 3-pointers while having 17 points, four rebounds, two assists and a steal in a 126–113 win against the Memphis Grizzlies.

Achiuwa made 55 appearances (including 12 starts) for Toronto during the 2022–23 NBA season, recording averages of 9.2 points, 6.0 rebounds, and 0.9 assists. He played in 25 games for the Raptors as a reserve in 2023–24, averaging 7.7 points, 5.4 rebounds, and 1.8 assists.

=== New York Knicks (2023–2025) ===
On December 30, 2023, Achiuwa was traded alongside OG Anunoby and Malachi Flynn to the New York Knicks in exchange for RJ Barrett, Immanuel Quickley, and a second-round draft pick. He played in 49 games (starting 18) for the Knicks across the remainder of the 2023–24 season, averaging 7.6 points, 7.2 rebounds, and 1.1 assists.

On July 30, 2024, Achiuwa re-signed with the Knicks on a one-year, $6 million contract. On October 20, the Knicks announced that Achiuwa suffered a strained left hamstring, missing the beginning of the season for 2-to-4 weeks. He made 57 appearances (including 10 starts) for New York during the 2024–25 NBA season, averaging 6.6 points, 5.6 rebounds, and 1.0 assists.

=== Sacramento Kings (2025–present) ===
On September 25, 2025, Achiuwa signed with the Miami Heat, returning to the franchise for the second time in his career. On October 18, he was waived by the Heat.

Achiuwa signed with the Sacramento Kings on November 4, 2025. On February 26, 2026, Achiuwa recorded 12 rebounds, four assists, three steals, and a career-high 29 points in a 130–121 victory over the Dallas Mavericks. On April 1, he logged 28 points, 19 rebounds, one assist, and one block in Sacramento's 123–115 victory over the Toronto Raptors. Achiuwa made 73 appearances (including 57 starts) for the Kings during the 2025–26 season, recording averages of 10.1 points (a career–high), 6.7 rebounds, and 1.4 assists.

On July 7, 2026, Achiuwa re-signed with the Kings on a two-year, $11 million contract.

== Career statistics ==
Legend
GP	Games played	GS	Games started	MPG	Minutes per game
FG%	Field goal percentage	3P%	3-point field goal percentage	FT%	Free throw percentage
RPG	Rebounds per game	APG	Assists per game	SPG	Steals per game
BPG	Blocks per game	PPG	Points per game	**Bold**	Career high

=== NBA ===
==== Regular season ====
Year	Team	GP	GS	MPG	FG%	3P%	FT%	RPG	APG	SPG	BPG	PPG
2020–21	Miami	61	4	12.1	**.544**	.000	.509	3.4	.5	.3	.5	5.0
2021–22	Toronto	**73**	28	23.6	.439	**.359**	.595	6.5	1.1	.5	.6	9.1
2022–23	Toronto	55	12	20.7	.485	.269	**.702**	6.0	.9	.6	.5	9.2
2023–24	Toronto	25	0	17.5	.459	.277	.571	5.4	**1.8**	.6	.5	7.7
2023–24	New York	49	18	**24.2**	.525	.260	.643	**7.2**	1.1	.6	**1.1**	7.6
2024–25	New York	57	10	20.5	.502	.278	.594	5.6	1.0	.8	.7	6.6
2025–26	Sacramento	**73**	**57**	23.9	.528	.278	.554	6.7	1.4	**.9**	.7	**10.1**
Career		393	129	20.7	.494	.299	.596	5.9	1.1	.6	.7	8.0

==== Playoffs ====
Year	Team	GP	GS	MPG	FG%	3P%	FT%	RPG	APG	SPG	BPG	PPG
2021	Miami	3	0	4.1	**.750**	—	.250	2.0	.0	.0	.7	2.3
2022	Toronto	6	1	**27.8**	.481	**.313**	**.600**	**4.8**	**1.0**	.2	.8	**10.2**
2024	New York	**9**	**2**	20.5	.488	.000	.385	4.2	.6	**.4**	**1.3**	5.2
2025	New York	8	0	4.3	.429	.000	.500	1.1	.0	.1	.0	1.8
Career		26	3	15.3	.487	.250	.452	3.2	.4	.2	.7	5.0

=== College ===
Year	Team	GP	GS	MPG	FG%	3P%	FT%	RPG	APG	SPG	BPG	PPG
2019–20	Memphis	31	31	30.4	.493	.325	.599	10.8	1.0	1.1	1.9	15.8
Career		31	31	30.4	.493	.325	.599	10.8	1.0	1.1	1.9	15.8

== Personal life ==
Precious Achiuwa's older brother, God'sgift Achiuwa, played college basketball for St. John's from 2011 to 2014. His mother, Eunice, and father, Donatus, are both Pentecostal ministers. In addition to God'sgift, he has two other brothers, God'swill and Promise, and two sisters, Grace and Peace.
