= 2021–22 Philadelphia 76ers season =

- Head coach: Doc Rivers
- President: Daryl Morey
- General manager: Elton Brand
- Owners: Josh Harris
- Arena: Wells Fargo Center

Results
- Record: 51–31 (.622)
- Place: Division: 2nd (Atlantic); Conference: 4th (Eastern)
- Playoff finish: Conference semifinals (lost to Heat 2–4)
- Stats at Basketball Reference

Local media
- Television: NBCSPHI, NBCSPHI+, 6ABC
- Radio: WPEN

The 2021–22 Philadelphia 76ers season was the 73rd season for the franchise in the National Basketball Association (NBA).

The season was marred by controversy as All-Star guard Ben Simmons demanded to be traded due to his refusal to play for the team, and had missed training camp to enforce his holdout. The 76ers fined Simmons for conduct detrimental to the team and would continue to do so throughout the season. This led to Simmons being the most fined player in NBA history, with reports suggesting he had lost more than $10 million by the end of 2021.

On February 10, 2022, Simmons, along with Seth Curry, Andre Drummond, and draft picks, were traded to the Brooklyn Nets in exchange for All-Star guard James Harden and Paul Millsap.

On April 3, after a win over the Cleveland Cavaliers, the Sixers clinched their fifth consecutive playoff appearance.

The Sixers defeated the Toronto Raptors in the first round in six games and avenged their second-round loss to them in 2019. They faced the Miami Heat in the second round where they lost in six games.

== Draft picks ==
Round	Pick	Player	Position(s)	Nationality	College / Club
1	28	Jaden Springer	SG	United States	Tennessee
2	50	Filip Petrušev	C	Serbia	Gonzaga
2	53	Charles Bassey	C	Nigeria	Western Kentucky

The Sixers initially carried one first-round pick and two second-round picks in the draft. The 50th pick was given via New York by the Willy Hernangómez trade made in 2015. It was reported that the 50th pick Filip Petrušev would not join the 2021–22 roster. Petrušev signed for Turkish team Anadolu Efes on August 17.

== Roster ==
2021–22 Philadelphia 76ers roster
Players

Pos.	No.	Player	Height	Weight	DOB	From
C	23	Charles Bassey	6 ft 11 in (2.11 m)	230 lb (104 kg)	2000-10-28	Western Kentucky
G	16	Charlie Brown (TW)	6 ft 6 in (1.98 m)	199 lb (90 kg)	1997-02-02	Saint Joseph's
C	21	Joel Embiid (C)	7 ft 0 in (2.13 m)	280 lb (127 kg)	1994-03-16	Kansas
G	14	Danny Green	6 ft 6 in (1.98 m)	215 lb (98 kg)	1987-06-22	North Carolina
G	1	James Harden	6 ft 5 in (1.96 m)	220 lb (100 kg)	1989-08-26	Arizona State
F	12	Tobias Harris	6 ft 9 in (2.06 m)	235 lb (107 kg)	1992-07-15	Tennessee
G	7	Isaiah Joe	6 ft 4 in (1.93 m)	165 lb (75 kg)	1999-07-02	Arkansas
C	9	DeAndre Jordan	6 ft 11 in (2.11 m)	265 lb (120 kg)	1988-07-21	Texas A&M
G/F	30	Furkan Korkmaz	6 ft 7 in (2.01 m)	202 lb (92 kg)	1997-07-24	Turkey
G	0	Tyrese Maxey	6 ft 2 in (1.88 m)	200 lb (91 kg)	2000-10-04	Kentucky
G	18	Shake Milton	6 ft 5 in (1.96 m)	205 lb (93 kg)	1996-09-26	SMU
F	8	Paul Millsap	6 ft 7 in (2.01 m)	257 lb (117 kg)	1985-02-10	Louisiana Tech
F	20	Georges Niang	6 ft 7 in (2.01 m)	230 lb (104 kg)	1993-06-17	Iowa State
G	5	Myles Powell (TW)	6 ft 2 in (1.88 m)	195 lb (88 kg)	1997-07-07	Seton Hall
F	44	Paul Reed	6 ft 9 in (2.06 m)	220 lb (100 kg)	1999-06-26	DePaul
G	11	Jaden Springer	6 ft 3 in (1.91 m)	202 lb (92 kg)	2002-09-25	Tennessee
G	22	Matisse Thybulle	6 ft 5 in (1.96 m)	200 lb (91 kg)	1997-03-04	Washington

Coaches
Head coach
- Doc Rivers
Assistant(s)
- Brian Adams
- Dan Burke
- Sam Cassell
- Eric Hughes
- Dave Joerger
- Jamie Young

Legend
- (DP) Unsigned draft pick
- (FA) Free agent
- (S) Suspended
- (GL) On assignment to G League affiliate
- (TW) Two-way affiliate player
- Injured

Roster
Updated: April 15, 2022

== Standings ==
=== Atlantic division ===
Atlantic Division	W	L	PCT	GB	Home	Road	Div	GP
y – Boston Celtics	51	31	.622	–	28‍–‍13	23‍–‍18	9–7	82
x – Philadelphia 76ers	51	31	.622	–	24‍–‍17	27‍–‍14	6–10	82
x – Toronto Raptors	48	34	.585	3.0	24‍–‍17	24‍–‍17	10–6	82
x − Brooklyn Nets	44	38	.537	7.0	20‍–‍21	24‍–‍17	10–6	82
New York Knicks	37	45	.451	14.0	17‍–‍24	20‍–‍21	5–11	82

=== Conference standings ===
Eastern Conference
#	Team	W	L	PCT	GB	GP
1	c – Miami Heat *	53	29	.646	–	82
2	y – Boston Celtics *	51	31	.622	2.0	82
3	y – Milwaukee Bucks *	51	31	.622	2.0	82
4	x – Philadelphia 76ers	51	31	.622	2.0	82
5	x – Toronto Raptors	48	34	.585	5.0	82
6	x – Chicago Bulls	46	36	.561	7.0	82
7	x − Brooklyn Nets	44	38	.537	9.0	82
8	pi − Cleveland Cavaliers	44	38	.537	9.0	82
9	x − Atlanta Hawks	43	39	.524	10.0	82
10	pi − Charlotte Hornets	43	39	.524	10.0	82
11	New York Knicks	37	45	.451	16.0	82
12	Washington Wizards	35	47	.427	18.0	82
13	Indiana Pacers	25	57	.305	28.0	82
14	Detroit Pistons	23	59	.280	30.0	82
15	Orlando Magic	22	60	.268	31.0	82

== Game log ==
=== Preseason ===
2021 pre-season game log
Total: 2–2 (home: 2–0; road: 0–2)
Preseason: 2–2 (home: 2–0; road: 0–2)

Game	Date	Team	Score	High points	High rebounds	High assists	Location Attendance	Record
1	October 4	@ Toronto	L 107–123	Andre Drummond (19)	Andre Drummond (14)	Shake Milton (5)	Scotiabank Arena; 8,016	0–1
2	October 7	Toronto	W 125–113	Georges Niang (16)	Andre Drummond (7)	Tyrese Maxey (5)	Wells Fargo Center; 11,732	1–1
3	October 12	Brooklyn	W 115–104	Furkan Korkmaz (27)	Paul Reed (10)	Andre Drummond (6)	Wells Fargo Center; 14,522	2–1
4	October 15	@ Detroit	L 108–112	Andre Drummond (17)	Andre Drummond (7)	Drummond, Henry, Joe, Maxey (3)	Little Caesars Arena; 7,623	2–2

2021–22 season schedule

=== Regular season ===
2021–22 game log
Total: 51–31 (home: 24–16; road: 27–14)
October: 4–2 (home: 2–1; road: 2–1)

Game	Date	Team	Score	High points	High rebounds	High assists	Location Attendance	Record
1	October 20	@ New Orleans	W 117–97	Embiid, Korkmaz (22)	Tobias Harris (12)	Embiid, Korkmaz, Maxey (5)	Smoothie King Center; 12,845	1–0
2	October 22	Brooklyn	L 109–114	Curry, Harris (23)	Andre Drummond (10)	Embiid, Harris (4)	Wells Fargo Center; 20,367	1–1
3	October 24	@ Oklahoma City	W 115–103	Seth Curry (28)	Embiid, Harris (9)	Joel Embiid (6)	Paycom Center; 14,256	2–1
4	October 26	@ New York	L 99–112	Tobias Harris (23)	Drummond, Harris (9)	Tobias Harris (9)	Madison Square Garden; 15,218	2–2
5	October 28	Detroit	W 110–102	Joel Embiid (30)	Joel Embiid (18)	Tyrese Maxey (6)	Wells Fargo Center; 20,017	3–2
6	October 30	Atlanta	W 122–94	Tobias Harris (22)	Tobias Harris (11)	Tobias Harris (4)	Wells Fargo Center; 20,031	4–2

November: 7–8 (home: 3–4; road: 4–4)

Game	Date	Team	Score	High points	High rebounds	High assists	Location Attendance	Record
7	November 1	Portland	W 113–103	Seth Curry (23)	Andre Drummond (15)	Drummond, Maxey (7)	Wells Fargo Center; 20,115	5–2
8	November 3	Chicago	W 103–98	Seth Curry (22)	Joel Embiid (9)	Joel Embiid (7)	Wells Fargo Center; 20,438	6–2
9	November 4	@ Detroit	W 109–98	Seth Curry (23)	Embiid, Reed (9)	Maxey, Milton (5)	Little Caesars Arena; 8,702	7–2
10	November 6	@ Chicago	W 114–105	Joel Embiid (30)	Joel Embiid (15)	Tyrese Maxey (8)	United Center; 20,936	8–2
11	November 8	New York	L 96–103	Furkan Korkmaz (19)	Andre Drummond (25)	Seth Curry (6)	Wells Fargo Center; 20,224	8–3
12	November 9	Milwaukee	L 109–118	Tyrese Maxey (31)	Andre Drummond (20)	Shake Milton (6)	Wells Fargo Center; 20,029	8–4
13	November 11	Toronto	L 109–115	Tyrese Maxey (33)	Andre Drummond (12)	Tobias Harris (7)	Wells Fargo Center; 20,112	8–5
14	November 13	@ Indiana	L 113–118	Tobias Harris (32)	Andre Drummond (17)	Seth Curry (5)	Gainbridge Fieldhouse; 14,483	8–6
15	November 16	@ Utah	L 85–120	Shake Milton (18)	Isaiah Joe (8)	Tobias Harris (5)	Vivint Arena; 18,306	8–7
16	November 18	@ Denver	W 103–89	Tyrese Maxey (22)	Bassey, Harris (7)	Seth Curry (5)	Ball Arena; 14,547	9–7
17	November 20	@ Portland	L 111–118	Harris, Maxey (28)	Tobias Harris (8)	Tyrese Maxey (8)	Moda Center; 17,027	9–8
18	November 22	@ Sacramento	W 102–94	Tyrese Maxey (24)	Andre Drummond (23)	Furkan Korkmaz (6)	Golden 1 Center; 13,948	10–8
19	November 24	@ Golden State	L 96–116	Seth Curry (24)	Andre Drummond (12)	Tyrese Maxey (5)	Chase Center; 18,064	10–9
20	November 27	Minnesota	L 120–121 (2OT)	Joel Embiid (42)	Joel Embiid (14)	Tyrese Maxey (9)	Wells Fargo Center; 21,011	10–10
21	November 29	Orlando	W 101–96	Seth Curry (24)	Joel Embiid (13)	Tyrese Maxey (9)	Wells Fargo Center; 20,193	11–10

December: 8–6 (home: 1–3; road: 7–3)

Game	Date	Team	Score	High points	High rebounds	High assists	Location Attendance	Record
22	December 1	@ Boston	L 87–88	Seth Curry (17)	Joel Embiid (18)	Curry, Embiid (6)	TD Garden; 19,156	11–11
23	December 3	@ Atlanta	W 98–96	Joel Embiid (28)	Joel Embiid (12)	Curry, Maxey (5)	State Farm Arena; 17,092	12–11
24	December 6	@ Charlotte	W 127–124 (OT)	Joel Embiid (43)	Joel Embiid (15)	Joel Embiid (7)	Spectrum Center; 14,462	13–11
25	December 8	@ Charlotte	W 110–106	Joel Embiid (32)	Joel Embiid (8)	Seth Curry (8)	Spectrum Center; 15,709	14–11
26	December 9	Utah	L 96–118	Joel Embiid (19)	Joel Embiid (9)	Seth Curry (4)	Wells Fargo Center; 20,272	14–12
27	December 11	Golden State	W 102–93	Joel Embiid (26)	Drummond, Embiid, Harris (9)	Joel Embiid (4)	Wells Fargo Center; 21,016	15–12
28	December 13	@ Memphis	L 91–126	Tyrese Maxey (23)	Charles Bassey (10)	Tyrese Maxey (7)	FedExForum; 13,420	15–13
29	December 15	Miami	L 96–101	Tyrese Maxey (27)	Joel Embiid (14)	Embiid, Maxey, Milton (5)	Wells Fargo Center; 20,389	15–14
30	December 16	@ Brooklyn	L 105–114	Joel Embiid (32)	Joel Embiid (9)	Joel Embiid (6)	Barclays Center; 17,053	15–15
—	December 19	New Orleans	Postponed (Makeup date: January 25)					
31	December 20	@ Boston	W 108–103	Joel Embiid (41)	Joel Embiid (10)	Seth Curry (7)	TD Garden; 19,156	16–15
32	December 23	Atlanta	L 96–98	Joel Embiid (23)	Joel Embiid (10)	Curry, Harris (5)	Wells Fargo Center; 20,408	16–16
33	December 26	@ Washington	W 117–96	Joel Embiid (36)	Joel Embiid (13)	Seth Curry (9)	Capital One Arena; 16,767	17–16
34	December 28	@ Toronto	W 114–109	Joel Embiid (36)	Tobias Harris (12)	Tobias Harris (10)	Scotiabank Arena; 6,960	18–16
35	December 30	@ Brooklyn	W 110–102	Joel Embiid (34)	Andre Drummond (10)	Curry, Harris (6)	Barclays Center; 17,732	19–16

January: 12–3 (home: 8–2; road: 4–1)

Game	Date	Team	Score	High points	High rebounds	High assists	Location Attendance	Record
36	January 3	Houston	W 133–113	Joel Embiid (31)	Joel Embiid (15)	Joel Embiid (10)	Wells Fargo Center; 20,026	20–16
37	January 5	@ Orlando	W 116–106	Joel Embiid (31)	Tobias Harris (9)	Seth Curry (12)	Amway Center; 13,116	21–16
38	January 7	San Antonio	W 119–100	Joel Embiid (31)	Joel Embiid (12)	Curry, Embiid (7)	Wells Fargo Center; 20,265	22–16
39	January 10	@ Houston	W 111–91	Joel Embiid (31)	Andre Drummond (11)	Joel Embiid (6)	Toyota Center; 13,593	23–16
40	January 12	Charlotte	L 98–109	Joel Embiid (31)	Drummond, Harris (8)	Tobias Harris (5)	Wells Fargo Center; 20,317	23–17
41	January 14	Boston	W 111–99	Joel Embiid (25)	Joel Embiid (13)	Seth Curry (7)	Wells Fargo Center; 20,444	24–17
42	January 15	@ Miami	W 109–98	Joel Embiid (32)	Joel Embiid (12)	Seth Curry (5)	FTX Arena; 19,600	25–17
43	January 17	@ Washington	L 98–117	Joel Embiid (32)	Charlie Brown Jr. (9)	Curry, Korkmaz (5)	Capital One Arena; 14,581	25–18
44	January 19	Orlando	W 123–110	Joel Embiid (50)	Joel Embiid (12)	Furkan Korkmaz (5)	Wells Fargo Center; 20,081	26–18
45	January 21	L.A. Clippers	L 101–102	Joel Embiid (40)	Joel Embiid (13)	Tyrese Maxey (8)	Wells Fargo Center; 20,182	26–19
46	January 23	@ San Antonio	W 115–109	Joel Embiid (38)	Joel Embiid (12)	Embiid, Maxey (6)	AT&T Center; 16,437	27–19
47	January 25	New Orleans	W 117–107	Joel Embiid (42)	Joel Embiid (14)	Georges Niang (6)	Wells Fargo Center; 20,121	28–19
48	January 27	L.A. Lakers	W 105–87	Joel Embiid (26)	Andre Drummond (10)	Tyrese Maxey (10)	Wells Fargo Center; 20,953	29–19
49	January 29	Sacramento	W 103–101	Joel Embiid (36)	Joel Embiid (12)	Tyrese Maxey (7)	Wells Fargo Center; 20,380	30–19
50	January 31	Memphis	W 122–119 (OT)	Tyrese Maxey (33)	Andre Drummond (23)	Curry, Maxey (8)	Wells Fargo Center; 20,424	31–19

February: 6–4 (home: 2–3; road: 4–1)

Game	Date	Team	Score	High points	High rebounds	High assists	Location Attendance	Record
51	February 2	Washington	L 103–106	Joel Embiid (27)	Joel Embiid (14)	Tyrese Maxey (7)	Wells Fargo Center; 20,089	31–20
52	February 4	@ Dallas	L 98–107	Joel Embiid (27)	Joel Embiid (13)	Tyrese Maxey (6)	American Airlines Center; 19,200	31–21
53	February 6	@ Chicago	W 119–108	Joel Embiid (40)	Joel Embiid (10)	Tyrese Maxey (6)	United Center; 20,233	32–21
54	February 8	Phoenix	L 109–114	Joel Embiid (34)	Joel Embiid (12)	Andre Drummond (5)	Wells Fargo Center; 20,720	32–22
55	February 11	Oklahoma City	W 100–87	Joel Embiid (25)	Joel Embiid (19)	Embiid, Korkmaz (4)	Wells Fargo Center; 20,669	33–22
56	February 12	Cleveland	W 103–93	Joel Embiid (40)	Joel Embiid (14)	Joel Embiid (10)	Wells Fargo Center; 21,057	34–22
57	February 15	Boston	L 87–135	Joel Embiid (19)	Joel Embiid (9)	Joel Embiid (6)	Wells Fargo Center; 20,960	34–23
58	February 17	@ Milwaukee	W 123–120	Joel Embiid (42)	Joel Embiid (14)	Joel Embiid (5)	Fiserv Forum; 17,341	35–23
59	February 25	@ Minnesota	W 133–102	Joel Embiid (34)	Joel Embiid (10)	James Harden (12)	Target Center; 16,684	36–23
60	February 27	@ New York	W 125–109	Joel Embiid (37)	James Harden (10)	James Harden (16)	Madison Square Garden; 19,812	37–23

March: 9–7 (home: 5–4; road: 4–3)

Game	Date	Team	Score	High points	High rebounds	High assists	Location Attendance	Record
61	March 2	New York	W 123–108	Joel Embiid (27)	Joel Embiid (12)	James Harden (9)	Wells Fargo Center; 21,333	38–23
62	March 4	Cleveland	W 125–119	Tyrese Maxey (33)	Joel Embiid (9)	James Harden (11)	Wells Fargo Center; 21,391	39–23
63	March 5	@ Miami	L 82–99	Joel Embiid (22)	Joel Embiid (15)	Georges Niang (3)	FTX Arena; 19,704	39–24
64	March 7	Chicago	W 121–106	Joel Embiid (43)	Joel Embiid (14)	James Harden (14)	Wells Fargo Center; 20,381	40–24
65	March 10	Brooklyn	L 100–129	Joel Embiid (27)	Joel Embiid (12)	Harden, Milton (5)	Wells Fargo Center; 21,408	40–25
66	March 13	@ Orlando	W 116–114 (OT)	Joel Embiid (35)	Joel Embiid (16)	Joel Embiid (7)	Amway Center; 14,444	41–25
67	March 14	Denver	L 110–114	Joel Embiid (34)	Embiid, Harden (9)	James Harden (11)	Wells Fargo Center; 21,444	41–26
68	March 16	@ Cleveland	W 118–114	Joel Embiid (35)	Joel Embiid (17)	James Harden (11)	Rocket Mortgage FieldHouse; 19,432	42–26
69	March 18	Dallas	W 111–101	Joel Embiid (32)	Joel Embiid (8)	James Harden (12)	Wells Fargo Center; 21,428	43–26
70	March 20	Toronto	L 88–93	Joel Embiid (21)	Joel Embiid (13)	James Harden (8)	Wells Fargo Center; 21,180	43–27
71	March 21	Miami	W 113–106	Tyrese Maxey (28)	Harris, Jordan (8)	Harris, Milton (6)	Wells Fargo Center; 21,386	44–27
72	March 23	@ L.A. Lakers	W 126–121	Joel Embiid (30)	Joel Embiid (10)	Harden, Maxey (7)	Crypto.com Arena; 18,997	45–27
73	March 25	@ L.A. Clippers	W 122–97	James Harden (29)	James Harden (15)	James Harden (7)	Crypto.com Arena; 19,068	46–27
74	March 27	@ Phoenix	L 104–114	Joel Embiid (37)	Joel Embiid (15)	James Harden (9)	Footprint Center; 17,071	46–28
75	March 29	Milwaukee	L 116–118	James Harden (32)	Joel Embiid (14)	James Harden (9)	Wells Fargo Center; 21,467	46–29
76	March 31	@ Detroit	L 94–102	Joel Embiid (37)	Joel Embiid (15)	James Harden (7)	Little Caesars Arena; 20,023	46–30

April: 5–1 (home: 3–0; road: 2–1)

Game	Date	Team	Score	High points	High rebounds	High assists	Location Attendance	Record
77	April 2	Charlotte	W 144–114	Joel Embiid (29)	Joel Embiid (14)	James Harden (13)	Wells Fargo Center; 21,509	47–30
78	April 3	@ Cleveland	W 112–108	Joel Embiid (47)	Joel Embiid (17)	James Harden (10)	Rocket Mortgage FieldHouse; 19,432	48–30
79	April 5	@ Indiana	W 131–122	Joel Embiid (45)	Joel Embiid (13)	James Harden (14)	Gainbridge Fieldhouse; 15,583	49–30
80	April 7	@ Toronto	L 114–119	Joel Embiid (30)	Joel Embiid (10)	James Harden (15)	Scotiabank Arena; 19,800	49–31
81	April 9	Indiana	W 133–120	Joel Embiid (41)	Joel Embiid (20)	James Harden (14)	Wells Fargo Center; 21,171	50–31
82	April 10	Detroit	W 118–106	Shake Milton (30)	DeAndre Jordan (11)	Tobias Harris (6)	Wells Fargo Center; 21,459	51–31

2021–22 season schedule

=== Playoffs ===
2022 playoff game log
Total: 6–6 (home: 4–2; road: 2–4)
First Round: 4–2 (home: 2–1; road: 2–1)

Game	Date	Team	Score	High points	High rebounds	High assists	Location Attendance	Series
1	April 16	Toronto	W 131–111	Tyrese Maxey (38)	Joel Embiid (15)	James Harden (14)	Wells Fargo Center; 20,610	1–0
2	April 18	Toronto	W 112–97	Joel Embiid (31)	Joel Embiid (11)	Tyrese Maxey (8)	Wells Fargo Center; 20,974	2–0
3	April 20	@ Toronto	W 104–101 (OT)	Joel Embiid (33)	Joel Embiid (13)	James Harden (10)	Scotiabank Arena; 19,800	3–0
4	April 23	@ Toronto	L 102–110	James Harden (22)	Tobias Harris (11)	James Harden (9)	Scotiabank Arena; 19,800	3–1
5	April 25	Toronto	L 88–103	Joel Embiid (20)	Joel Embiid (11)	James Harden (7)	Wells Fargo Center; 20,517	3–2
6	April 28	@ Toronto	W 132–97	Joel Embiid (33)	Tobias Harris (11)	James Harden (15)	Scotiabank Arena; 19,800	4–2

Conference Semifinals: 2–4 (home: 2–1; road: 0–3)

Game	Date	Team	Score	High points	High rebounds	High assists	Location Attendance	Series
1	May 2	@ Miami	L 92–106	Tobias Harris (27)	Harden, Reed (9)	James Harden (5)	FTX Arena; 19,620	0–1
2	May 4	@ Miami	L 103–119	Tyrese Maxey (34)	Furkan Korkmaz (6)	James Harden (9)	FTX Arena; 19,759	0–2
3	May 6	Miami	W 99–79	Green, Maxey (21)	Joel Embiid (11)	Tobias Harris (8)	Wells Fargo Center; 21,033	1–2
4	May 8	Miami	W 116–108	James Harden (31)	Joel Embiid (11)	James Harden (9)	Wells Fargo Center; 21,194	2–2
5	May 10	@ Miami	L 85–120	Joel Embiid (17)	Paul Reed (8)	James Harden (4)	FTX Arena; 19,868	2–3
6	May 12	Miami	L 90–99	Embiid, Harden (20)	Joel Embiid (12)	James Harden (9)	Wells Fargo Center; 21,082	2–4

2022 playoff schedule

== Player statistics ==
Legend
GP	Games played	GS	Games started	MPG	Minutes per game
FG%	Field-goal percentage	3P%	3-point field-goal percentage	FT%	Free-throw percentage
RPG	Rebounds per game	APG	Assists per game	SPG	Steals per game
BPG	Blocks per game	PPG	Points per game

=== Regular season ===
Player	GP	GS	MPG	FG%	3P%	FT%	RPG	APG	SPG	BPG	PPG
Georges Niang	76	7	22.8	.437	.403	.881	2.7	1.3	.4	.2	9.2
Tyrese Maxey	75	74	35.3	.485	.427	.866	3.2	4.3	.7	.4	17.5
Tobias Harris	73	73	34.8	.482	.367	.842	6.8	3.5	.6	.6	17.2
Joel Embiid	68	68	33.8	.499	.371	.814	11.7	4.2	1.1	1.5	30.6
Furkan Korkmaz	67	19	21.1	.387	.289	.810	2.6	1.9	.5	.1	7.6
Matisse Thybulle	66	50	25.5	.500	.313	.791	2.3	1.1	1.7	1.1	5.7
Danny Green	62	28	21.8	.394	.380	.786	2.5	1.0	1.0	.6	5.9
Shake Milton	55	6	21.4	.429	.323	.836	2.6	2.5	.5	.3	8.2
Isaiah Joe	55	1	11.1	.350	.333	.935	1.0	.6	.3	.1	3.6
Andre Drummond^{†}	49	12	18.4	.538	.000	.512	8.8	2.0	1.1	.9	6.1
Seth Curry^{†}	45	45	34.8	.485	.400	.877	3.4	4.0	.8	.2	15.0
Paul Reed	38	2	7.9	.563	.250	.429	2.4	.4	.9	.4	3.1
Charles Bassey	23	0	7.3	.638	.000	.750	2.7	.3	.2	.7	3.0
James Harden^{†}	21	21	37.7	.402	.326	.892	7.1	10.5	1.2	.2	21.0
Charlie Brown Jr.^{†}	19	2	8.5	.265	.111	.900	1.6	.3	.4	.2	1.5
DeAndre Jordan^{†}	16	1	13.4	.593		.714	5.8	.5	.1	.6	4.6
Myles Powell	11	0	4.7	.294	.167	1.000	.5	.3	.1	.0	1.2
Paul Millsap^{†}	9	1	11.8	.433	.250	.714	2.8	.6	.6	.2	3.7
Aaron Henry	6	0	2.8	.200	.000		.2	.0	.0	.3	.3
Tyler Johnson^{†}	3	0	12.7	.400	.429		2.0	.7	.3	.3	3.7
Braxton Key^{†}	2	0	3.0	.500	.000		1.0	.5	.5	.0	1.0
Jaden Springer	2	0	3.0	1.000			1.0	.0	.0	1.0	1.0
Willie Cauley-Stein^{†}	2	0	3.0				1.0	.5	.0	.0	.0

=== Playoffs ===
Player	GP	GS	MPG	FG%	3P%	FT%	RPG	APG	SPG	BPG	PPG
Tyrese Maxey	12	12	40.4	.484	.377	.940	3.5	3.9	.8	.2	20.8
James Harden	12	12	39.9	.405	.368	.893	5.7	8.6	.8	.7	18.6
Tobias Harris	12	12	38.8	.500	.386	.864	7.6	2.9	1.1	.8	16.9
Danny Green	12	12	26.6	.404	.408	.000	3.1	.8	1.0	.3	8.6
Georges Niang	12	0	16.5	.417	.372	1.000	1.5	.9	.3	.0	4.8
Shake Milton	12	0	13.2	.474	.533	.800	1.6	.9	.5	.3	5.0
Paul Reed	12	0	11.7	.528	.667	.571	3.8	.8	.8	.5	3.7
Joel Embiid	10	10	38.5	.484	.212	.820	10.7	2.1	.4	.8	23.6
Matisse Thybulle	9	0	15.2	.458	.286	.333	1.0	.4	.8	.8	3.0
Furkan Korkmaz	9	0	6.8	.478	.400	1.000	1.3	.4	.1	.1	3.1
Isaiah Joe	7	0	2.1	.400	.333		.3	.0	.0	.0	.7
Jaden Springer	5	0	2.6	.500	.000		.8	.4	.0	.0	1.2
DeAndre Jordan	3	2	10.3	1.000			2.3	.3	.0	.7	3.3
Charles Bassey	3	0	4.0	.500		.000	1.7	.3	.0	.3	.7
Paul Millsap	1	0	6.0				1.0	1.0	.0	.0	.0

- ^{†} Denotes player spent time with another team in the season. Stats reflect time with the 76ers only.

== Transactions ==
=== Trades ===
July 29, 2021	To Philadelphia 76ers 2021 No. 53 pick	To New Orleans Pelicans Cash considerations
February 10, 2022	To Philadelphia 76ers James Harden; Paul Millsap	To Brooklyn Nets Ben Simmons; Seth Curry; Andre Drummond; 2027 First-round pick 2022 First-round pick

=== Free agency ===
==== Additions ====
Player	Contract terms	Former team	Ref.
Andre Drummond	1 year worth $592,103	Los Angeles Lakers	
