= 2021–22 Toronto Raptors season =

- Head coach: Nick Nurse
- President: Masai Ujiri
- General manager: Bobby Webster
- Owners: Maple Leaf Sports & Entertainment
- Arena: Scotiabank Arena

Results
- Record: 48–34 (.585)
- Place: Division: 3rd (Atlantic); Conference: 5th (Eastern)
- Playoff finish: First round (lost to 76ers 2–4)
- Stats at Basketball Reference

Local media
- Television: TSN; Sportsnet

The 2021–22 Toronto Raptors season was the 27th season of the franchise in the National Basketball Association (NBA).

The 2020–21 Raptors finished the season with a 27–45 record (in a shortened season due to the COVID-19 pandemic), and missed the playoffs for the first time since 2013. This season marked the first time since the 2012–13 season where the Raptors had their own lottery pick, and with that pick, which landed 4th overall in the 2021 NBA draft, they drafted power forward Scottie Barnes from Florida State. Barnes would go on to win the 2021–22 NBA Rookie of the Year Award.

The season was the first season that six-time All-Star and longtime Raptor Kyle Lowry was not on the roster since the 2011–12 season, as he was traded in a sign-and-trade deal to the Miami Heat for Goran Dragić and Precious Achiuwa.

On September 10, 2021, the Canadian government granted approval for the team to play home games in Toronto for the first time since the onset of the COVID-19 pandemic. In the prior season, they played their home games in Amalie Arena in Tampa, Florida.

After a win against the Atlanta Hawks and a Cleveland Cavaliers loss to the Orlando Magic on April 5, 2022, the Raptors returned to the playoffs after a one-year absence and clinched their eighth playoff appearance in nine seasons. However, the Raptors were eliminated by the 76ers in six games in the first round after being down 3–0 in that series.

== Draft picks ==
| Round | Pick | Player | Position | Nationality | School / club team |
|---|---|---|---|---|---|
| 1 | 4 | Scottie Barnes | SF | United States | Florida State (Fr.) |
| 2 | 46 | Dalano Banton | PG | Canada | Nebraska (So.) |
| 2 | 47 | David Johnson | PG | United States | Louisville (So.) |

The Raptors entered the draft with one original first-round pick and two acquired second-round picks. On the night of the 2021 NBA draft lottery, the team had a 7.5% chance of winning the first overall pick and ended up with the #4 pick. They also gained two second-round picks originally owned by the Memphis Grizzlies and Golden State Warriors as a result of previous trades with the Utah Jazz and Sacramento Kings, respectively. They have traded their original second-round pick to the Brooklyn Nets, who in turn traded it to the Detroit Pistons.

With the 4th overall pick, the Raptors selected future All-Star Scottie Barnes from Florida State. This marked the first time that the Raptors drafted a Canadian-born player in the draft, as they selected point guard Dalano Banton from Nebraska with the 46th pick.

== Roster ==
2021–22 Toronto Raptors roster
Players

| Pos. | No. | Player | Height | Weight | DOB | From |
|---|---|---|---|---|---|---|
| F/C | 5 | Precious Achiuwa | 6 ft 9 in (2.06 m) | 225 lb (102 kg) | 1999-09-19 | Memphis |
| F | 3 | OG Anunoby | 6 ft 7 in (2.01 m) | 232 lb (105 kg) | 1997-07-17 | Indiana |
| F | 45 | Dalano Banton | 6 ft 7 in (2.01 m) | 204 lb (93 kg) | 1999-11-07 | Nebraska |
| F | 4 | Scottie Barnes | 6 ft 8 in (2.03 m) | 225 lb (102 kg) | 2001-08-01 | Florida State |
| C | 24 | Khem Birch | 6 ft 9 in (2.06 m) | 233 lb (106 kg) | 1992-09-28 | UNLV |
| G | 17 | Isaac Bonga | 6 ft 8 in (2.03 m) | 180 lb (82 kg) | 1999-11-08 | Germany |
| F/C | 25 | Chris Boucher | 6 ft 10 in (2.08 m) | 215 lb (98 kg) | 1993-01-11 | Oregon |
| G | 1 | Armoni Brooks | 6 ft 3 in (1.91 m) | 195 lb (88 kg) | 1998-06-05 | Houston |
| G/F | 11 | Justin Champagnie (TW) | 6 ft 6 in (1.98 m) | 206 lb (93 kg) | 2001-06-29 | Pittsburgh |
| G | 22 | Malachi Flynn | 6 ft 1 in (1.85 m) | 175 lb (79 kg) | 1998-05-10 | San Diego State |
| G | 13 | David Johnson (TW) | 6 ft 4 in (1.93 m) | 203 lb (92 kg) | 2001-02-26 | Louisville |
| G/F | 14 | Sviatoslav Mykhailiuk | 6 ft 8 in (2.03 m) | 205 lb (93 kg) | 1997-06-10 | Kansas |
| F | 43 | Pascal Siakam | 6 ft 8 in (2.03 m) | 230 lb (104 kg) | 1994-04-02 | New Mexico State |
| G | 33 | Gary Trent | 6 ft 5 in (1.96 m) | 209 lb (95 kg) | 1999-01-18 | Duke |
| G | 23 | Fred VanVleet | 6 ft 1 in (1.85 m) | 197 lb (89 kg) | 1994-02-25 | Wichita State |
| G/F | 18 | Yuta Watanabe | 6 ft 9 in (2.06 m) | 215 lb (98 kg) | 1994-10-13 | George Washington |
| F | 21 | Thaddeus Young | 6 ft 8 in (2.03 m) | 235 lb (107 kg) | 1988-06-21 | Georgia Tech |

Coaches
Head coach
- Nick Nurse
Assistant(s)
- John Corbacio
- Trevor Gleeson
- Jon Goodwillie
- Adrian Griffin
- Eric Khoury
- Nathaniel Mitchell
- Jim Sann
- Earl Watson

Legend
- (DP) Unsigned draft pick
- (FA) Free agent
- (S) Suspended
- (GL) On assignment to G League affiliate
- (TW) Two-way affiliate player
- Injured

Roster
Updated: April 11, 2022

== Standings ==
=== Division ===
| Atlantic Division | W | L | PCT | GB | Home | Road | Div | GP |
|---|---|---|---|---|---|---|---|---|
| y – Boston Celtics | 51 | 31 | .622 | – | 28‍–‍13 | 23‍–‍18 | 9–7 | 82 |
| x – Philadelphia 76ers | 51 | 31 | .622 | – | 24‍–‍17 | 27‍–‍14 | 6–10 | 82 |
| x – Toronto Raptors | 48 | 34 | .585 | 3.0 | 24‍–‍17 | 24‍–‍17 | 10–6 | 82 |
| x − Brooklyn Nets | 44 | 38 | .537 | 7.0 | 20‍–‍21 | 24‍–‍17 | 10–6 | 82 |
| New York Knicks | 37 | 45 | .451 | 14.0 | 17‍–‍24 | 20‍–‍21 | 5–11 | 82 |

=== Conference ===
Eastern Conference
| # | Team | W | L | PCT | GB | GP |
|---|---|---|---|---|---|---|
| 1 | c – Miami Heat * | 53 | 29 | .646 | – | 82 |
| 2 | y – Boston Celtics * | 51 | 31 | .622 | 2.0 | 82 |
| 3 | y – Milwaukee Bucks * | 51 | 31 | .622 | 2.0 | 82 |
| 4 | x – Philadelphia 76ers | 51 | 31 | .622 | 2.0 | 82 |
| 5 | x – Toronto Raptors | 48 | 34 | .585 | 5.0 | 82 |
| 6 | x – Chicago Bulls | 46 | 36 | .561 | 7.0 | 82 |
| 7 | x − Brooklyn Nets | 44 | 38 | .537 | 9.0 | 82 |
| 8 | pi − Cleveland Cavaliers | 44 | 38 | .537 | 9.0 | 82 |
| 9 | x − Atlanta Hawks | 43 | 39 | .524 | 10.0 | 82 |
| 10 | pi − Charlotte Hornets | 43 | 39 | .524 | 10.0 | 82 |
| 11 | New York Knicks | 37 | 45 | .451 | 16.0 | 82 |
| 12 | Washington Wizards | 35 | 47 | .427 | 18.0 | 82 |
| 13 | Indiana Pacers | 25 | 57 | .305 | 28.0 | 82 |
| 14 | Detroit Pistons | 23 | 59 | .280 | 30.0 | 82 |
| 15 | Orlando Magic | 22 | 60 | .268 | 31.0 | 82 |

== Game log ==
=== Preseason ===
2021 pre-season game log
Total: 3–2 (home: 2–0; road: 1–2)
Preseason: 3–2 (home: 2–0; road: 1–2)

| Game | Date | Team | Score | High points | High rebounds | High assists | Location Attendance | Record |
|---|---|---|---|---|---|---|---|---|
| 1 | October 4 | Philadelphia | W 123–107 | OG Anunoby (21) | Justin Champagnie (10) | Fred VanVleet (8) | Scotiabank Arena; 8,016 | 1–0 |
| 2 | October 7 | @ Philadelphia | L 113–125 | OG Anunoby (22) | Precious Achiuwa (8) | Scottie Barnes (5) | Wells Fargo Center; 11,732 | 1–1 |
| 3 | October 9 | @ Boston | L 111–113 | Fred VanVleet (22) | Precious Achiuwa (13) | Scottie Barnes (8) | TD Garden; 19,156 | 1–2 |
| 4 | October 11 | Houston | W 107–92 | Achiuwa, Anunoby (17) | Achiuwa, Wainright (7) | Fred VanVleet (5) | Scotiabank Arena; 9,245 | 2–2 |
| 5 | October 12 | @ Washington | W 113–108 | Malachi Flynn (22) | Achiuwa, Champaigne (10) | Scottie Barnes (7) | Capital One Arena; 7,048 | 3–2 |

2021–22 season schedule

=== Regular season ===
2021–22 game log
Total: 48–34 (home: 24–17; road: 24–17)
October: 4–3 (home: 2–3; road: 2–0)

| Game | Date | Team | Score | High points | High rebounds | High assists | Location Attendance | Record |
|---|---|---|---|---|---|---|---|---|
| 1 | October 20 | Washington | L 83–98 | Barnes, VanVleet (12) | OG Anunoby (10) | Dragić, VanVleet (4) | Scotiabank Arena; 19,800 | 0–1 |
| 2 | October 22 | @ Boston | W 115–83 | Scottie Barnes (25) | Precious Achiuwa (15) | Fred VanVleet (9) | TD Garden; 19,156 | 1–1 |
| 3 | October 23 | Dallas | L 95–103 | OG Anunoby (23) | Precious Achiuwa (12) | Fred VanVleet (5) | Scotiabank Arena; 19,800 | 1–2 |
| 4 | October 25 | Chicago | L 108–111 | OG Anunoby (22) | Precious Achiuwa (11) | Fred VanVleet (17) | Scotiabank Arena; 19,800 | 1–3 |
| 5 | October 27 | Indiana | W 118–100 | Fred VanVleet (26) | Fred VanVleet (10) | Scottie Barnes (7) | Scotiabank Arena; 19,800 | 2–3 |
| 6 | October 29 | Orlando | W 110–109 | Scottie Barnes (21) | Scottie Barnes (9) | Fred VanVleet (6) | Scotiabank Arena; 19,800 | 3–3 |
| 7 | October 30 | @ Indiana | W 97–94 | Scottie Barnes (21) | Scottie Barnes (12) | OG Anunoby (5) | Gainbridge Fieldhouse; 10,578 | 4–3 |

November: 5–10 (home: 0–5; road: 5–5)

| Game | Date | Team | Score | High points | High rebounds | High assists | Location Attendance | Record |
|---|---|---|---|---|---|---|---|---|
| 8 | November 1 | @ New York | W 113–104 | OG Anunoby (36) | Precious Achiuwa (9) | Fred VanVleet (8) | Madison Square Garden; 16,528 | 5–3 |
| 9 | November 3 | @ Washington | W 109–100 | Fred VanVleet (33) | Precious Achiuwa (10) | Fred VanVleet (6) | Capital One Arena; 13,538 | 6–3 |
| 10 | November 5 | Cleveland | L 101–102 | OG Anunoby (23) | Scottie Barnes (9) | Fred VanVleet (6) | Scotiabank Arena; 19,800 | 6–4 |
| 11 | November 7 | Brooklyn | L 103–116 | Fred VanVleet (21) | Achiuwa, Anunoby (8) | Fred VanVleet (8) | Scotiabank Arena; 19,800 | 6–5 |
| 12 | November 10 | @ Boston | W 104–88 | Scottie Barnes (21) | Precious Achiuwa (9) | Fred VanVleet (6) | TD Garden; 19,156 | 6–6 |
| 13 | November 11 | @ Philadelphia | W 115–109 | Fred VanVleet (32) | Achiuwa, Barnes (9) | Fred VanVleet (7) | Wells Fargo Center; 20,112 | 7–6 |
| 14 | November 13 | Detroit | L 121–127 | Pascal Siakam (25) | Pascal Siakam (12) | Pascal Siakam (7) | Scotiabank Arena; 19,800 | 7–7 |
| 15 | November 15 | @ Portland | L 113–118 | OG Anunoby (29) | Scottie Barnes (8) | Fred VanVleet (7) | Moda Center; 16,142 | 7–8 |
| 16 | November 18 | @ Utah | L 103–119 | Gary Trent Jr. (31) | Chris Boucher (8) | Scottie Barnes (6) | Vivint Arena; 18,306 | 7–9 |
| 17 | November 19 | @ Sacramento | W 108–89 | Pascal Siakam (32) | Chris Boucher (12) | Barnes, VanVleet (6) | Golden 1 Center; 13,159 | 8–9 |
| 18 | November 21 | @ Golden State | L 104–119 | Pascal Siakam (21) | Scottie Barnes (13) | Fred VanVleet (7) | Chase Center; 18,064 | 8–10 |
| 19 | November 24 | @ Memphis | W 126–113 | Gary Trent Jr. (26) | Scottie Barnes (9) | Fred VanVleet (7) | FedEx Forum; 15,409 | 9–10 |
| 20 | November 26 | @ Indiana | L 97–114 | Fred VanVleet (26) | Pascal Siakam (12) | Barnes, Siakam, VanVleet (4) | Gainbridge Fieldhouse; 14,579 | 9–11 |
| 21 | November 28 | Boston | L 97–109 | Fred VanVleet (27) | Precious Achiuwa (9) | Pascal Siakam (5) | Scotiabank Arena; 19,800 | 9–12 |
| 22 | November 30 | Memphis | L 91–98 | Pascal Siakam (20) | Fred VanVleet (9) | Pascal Siakam (5) | Scotiabank Arena; 19,800 | 9–13 |

December: 6–4 (home: 6–2; road: 0–2)

| Game | Date | Team | Score | High points | High rebounds | High assists | Location Attendance | Record |
|---|---|---|---|---|---|---|---|---|
| 23 | December 2 | Milwaukee | W 97–93 | Fred VanVleet (29) | Achiuwa, Siakam, Trent Jr. (8) | Barnes, Siakam, VanVleet (4) | Scotiabank Arena; 19,800 | 10–13 |
| 24 | December 5 | Washington | W 102–90 | Pascal Siakam (31) | Precious Achiuwa (14) | Dalano Banton (6) | Scotiabank Arena; 19,800 | 11–13 |
| 25 | December 8 | Oklahoma | L 109–110 | Gary Trent Jr. (24) | Pascal Siakam (11) | Fred VanVleet (9) | Scotiabank Arena; 19,800 | 11–14 |
| 26 | December 10 | New York | W 90–87 | Gary Trent Jr. (24) | Scottie Barnes (15) | Fred VanVleet (11) | Scotiabank Arena; 19,800 | 12–14 |
| 27 | December 13 | Sacramento | W 124–101 | Barnes, Siakam (16) | Yuta Watanabe (10) | Fred VanVleet (5) | Scotiabank Arena; 19,463 | 13–14 |
| 28 | December 14 | @ Brooklyn | L 129–131 | Fred VanVleet (31) | Scottie Barnes (12) | Fred VanVleet (9) | Barclays Center; 17,325 | 13–15 |
| — | December 16 | Chicago | Postponed (COVID-19) | | | | | |
| 29 | December 18 | Golden State | W 119–100 | Fred VanVleet (27) | Barnes, Boucher (8) | Fred VanVleet (12) | Scotiabank Arena; 7,988 | 14–15 |
| — | December 20 | Orlando | Postponed (COVID-19) | | | | | |
| — | December 22 | @ Chicago | Postponed (COVID-19) | | | | | |
| 30 | December 26 | @ Cleveland | L 99–144 | Yuta Watanabe (26) | Yuta Watanabe (13) | Banton, Waters (6) | Rocket Mortgage FieldHouse; 19,432 | 14–16 |
| 31 | December 28 | Philadelphia | L 109–114 | Boucher, Siakam (28) | Chris Boucher (19) | Pascal Siakam (8) | Scotiabank Arena; 6,960 | 14–17 |
| 32 | December 31 | L.A. Clippers | W 116–108 | Fred VanVleet (31) | Pascal Siakam (19) | Fred VanVleet (9) | Scotiabank Arena; 0 | 15–17 |

January: 10–6 (home: 5–2; road: 5–4)

| Game | Date | Team | Score | High points | High rebounds | High assists | Location Attendance | Record |
|---|---|---|---|---|---|---|---|---|
| 33 | January 2 | New York | W 120–105 | Fred VanVleet (35) | Pascal Siakam (14) | Pascal Siakam (7) | Scotiabank Arena; 0 | 16–17 |
| 34 | January 4 | San Antonio | W 129–104 | Fred VanVleet (33) | Pascal Siakam (12) | Scottie Barnes (8) | Scotiabank Arena; 0 | 17–17 |
| 35 | January 5 | @ Milwaukee | W 117–111 | Pascal Siakam (33) | Precious Achiuwa (8) | Pascal Siakam (6) | Fiserv Forum; 17,341 | 18–17 |
| 36 | January 7 | Utah | W 122–108 | Fred VanVleet (37) | Fred VanVleet (10) | Fred VanVleet (10) | Scotiabank Arena; 0 | 19–17 |
| 37 | January 9 | New Orleans | W 105–101 | Fred VanVleet (32) | Pascal Siakam (10) | Pascal Siakam (7) | Scotiabank Arena; 0 | 20–17 |
| 38 | January 11 | Phoenix | L 95–99 | OG Anunoby (25) | Chris Boucher (16) | Pascal Siakam (7) | Scotiabank Arena; 0 | 20–18 |
| 39 | January 14 | @ Detroit | L 87–103 | Fred VanVleet (24) | Pascal Siakam (11) | Fred VanVleet (10) | Little Caesars Arena; 18,011 | 20–19 |
| 40 | January 15 | @ Milwaukee | W 103–96 | Pascal Siakam (30) | Justin Champagnie (12) | Pascal Siakam (10) | Fiserv Forum; 17,341 | 21–19 |
| 41 | January 17 | @ Miami | L 99–104 | Chris Boucher (23) | Precious Achiuwa (15) | Pascal Siakam (10) | FTX Arena; 19,600 | 21–20 |
| 42 | January 19 | @ Dallas | L 98–102 | Pascal Siakam (21) | Chris Boucher (12) | Fred VanVleet (12) | American Airlines Center; 19,218 | 21–21 |
| 43 | January 21 | @ Washington | W 109–105 | Scottie Barnes (27) | OG Anunoby (9) | Fred VanVleet (12) | Capital One Arena; 14,755 | 22–21 |
| 44 | January 23 | Portland | L 105–114 | Pascal Siakam (28) | Chris Boucher (9) | Fred VanVleet (8) | Scotiabank Arena; 0 | 22–22 |
| 45 | January 25 | Charlotte | W 125–113 | Gary Trent Jr. (32) | Pascal Siakam (9) | Pascal Siakam (12) | Scotiabank Arena; 0 | 23–22 |
| 46 | January 26 | @ Chicago | L 105–111 | Gary Trent Jr. (32) | Pascal Siakam (7) | Barnes, Siakam (7) | United Center; 20,269 | 23–23 |
| 47 | January 29 | @ Miami | W 124–120 (3OT) | Gary Trent Jr. (33) | OG Anunoby (14) | Fred VanVleet (8) | FTX Arena; 19,600 | 24–23 |
| 48 | January 31 | @ Atlanta | W 106–100 | Gary Trent Jr. (31) | Chris Boucher (7) | Fred VanVleet (11) | State Farm Arena; 14,168 | 25–23 |

February: 8–4 (home: 3–1; road: 5–3)

| Game | Date | Team | Score | High points | High rebounds | High assists | Location Attendance | Record |
|---|---|---|---|---|---|---|---|---|
| 49 | February 1 | Miami | W 110–106 | Gary Trent Jr. (33) | Pascal Siakam (14) | Fred VanVleet (6) | Scotiabank Arena; 0 | 26–23 |
| 50 | February 3 | Chicago | W 127–120 (OT) | Pascal Siakam (25) | Pascal Siakam (13) | Fred VanVleet (9) | Scotiabank Arena; 0 | 27–23 |
| 51 | February 4 | Atlanta | W 125–114 | Pascal Siakam (33) | OG Anunoby (10) | Fred VanVleet (11) | Scotiabank Arena; 0 | 28–23 |
| 52 | February 7 | @ Charlotte | W 116–101 | Siakam, Trent Jr. (24) | Pascal Siakam (11) | Pascal Siakam (8) | Spectrum Center; 14,102 | 29–23 |
| 53 | February 9 | @ Oklahoma City | W 117–98 | Pascal Siakam (27) | Pascal Siakam (16) | Fred VanVleet (6) | Paycom Center; 13,858 | 30–23 |
| 54 | February 10 | @ Houston | W 139–120 | Gary Trent Jr. (42) | Scottie Barnes (7) | Scottie Barnes (6) | Toyota Center; 16,129 | 31–23 |
| 55 | February 12 | Denver | L 109–110 | Pascal Siakam (35) | Pascal Siakam (10) | Pascal Siakam (7) | Scotiabank Arena; 0 | 31–24 |
| 56 | February 14 | @ New Orleans | L 90–120 | Fred VanVleet (20) | Birch, Boucher (6) | Anunoby, VanVleet (2) | Smoothie King Center; 15,319 | 31–25 |
| 57 | February 16 | @ Minnesota | W 103–91 | Gary Trent Jr. (30) | Chris Boucher (10) | Pascal Siakam (9) | Target Center; 15,982 | 32–25 |
| 58 | February 25 | @ Charlotte | L 93–125 | Scottie Barnes (28) | Achiuwa, Barnes, Young (5) | Malachi Flynn (5) | Spectrum Center; 17,577 | 32–26 |
| 59 | February 26 | @ Atlanta | L 100–127 | Fred VanVleet (24) | Pascal Siakam (10) | Fred VanVleet (9) | State Farm Arena; 17,870 | 32–27 |
| 60 | February 28 | @ Brooklyn | W 133–97 | Scottie Barnes (28) | Scottie Barnes (16) | Pascal Siakam (6) | Barclays Center; 17,112 | 33–27 |

March: 11–5 (home: 5–3; road: 6–2)

| Game | Date | Team | Score | High points | High rebounds | High assists | Location Attendance | Record |
|---|---|---|---|---|---|---|---|---|
| 61 | March 1 | Brooklyn | W 109–108 | Gary Trent Jr. (24) | Scottie Barnes (10) | Malachi Flynn (8) | Scotiabank Arena; 18,903 | 34–27 |
| 62 | March 3 | Detroit | L 106–108 | Pascal Siakam (28) | Barnes, Boucher (10) | Gary Trent Jr. (4) | Scotiabank Arena; 19,548 | 34–28 |
| 63 | March 4 | Orlando | L 97–103 | Pascal Siakam (34) | Pascal Siakam (14) | Malachi Flynn (8) | Scotiabank Arena; 19,081 | 34–29 |
| 64 | March 6 | @ Cleveland | L 96–104 | Pascal Siakam (24) | Scottie Barnes (12) | Scottie Barnes (6) | Rocket Mortgage FieldHouse; 19,432 | 34–30 |
| 65 | March 9 | @ San Antonio | W 119–104 | Fred VanVleet (26) | Barnes, Siakam (8) | Dalano Banton (4) | AT&T Center; 15,121 | 35–30 |
| 66 | March 11 | @ Phoenix | W 117–112 | Gary Trent Jr. (42) | Trent Jr., VanVleet (8) | Pascal Siakam (10) | Footprint Center; 17,071 | 36–30 |
| 67 | March 12 | @ Denver | W 127–115 | Pascal Siakam (33) | Chris Boucher (13) | Scottie Barnes (10) | Ball Arena; 18,659 | 37–30 |
| 68 | March 14 | @ L.A. Lakers | W 114–103 | Gary Trent Jr. (28) | Achiuwa, Siakam (11) | Fred VanVleet (7) | Crypto.com Arena; 18,228 | 38–30 |
| 69 | March 16 | @ L.A. Clippers | W 103–100 | Pascal Siakam (31) | Pascal Siakam (12) | Siakam, VanVleet (3) | Crypto.com Arena; 19,068 | 39–30 |
| 70 | March 18 | L.A. Lakers | L 123–128 (OT) | Scottie Barnes (31) | Scottie Barnes (17) | Siakam, VanVleet (7) | Scotiabank Arena; 19,800 | 39–31 |
| 71 | March 20 | @ Philadelphia | W 93–88 | Pascal Siakam (26) | Chris Boucher (10) | Pascal Siakam (5) | Wells Fargo Center; 21,180 | 40–31 |
| 72 | March 21 | @ Chicago | L 99–113 | Pascal Siakam (22) | Chris Boucher (10) | Fred VanVleet (9) | United Center; 21,778 | 40–32 |
| 73 | March 24 | Cleveland | W 117–104 | Pascal Siakam (35) | Chris Boucher (8) | Fred VanVleet (8) | Scotiabank Arena; 19,800 | 41–32 |
| 74 | March 26 | Indiana | W 131–91 | Pascal Siakam (23) | Chris Boucher (10) | Barnes, Siakam (7) | Scotiabank Arena; 19,800 | 42–32 |
| 75 | March 28 | Boston | W 115–112 (OT) | Pascal Siakam (40) | Pascal Siakam (13) | Scottie Barnes (4) | Scotiabank Arena; 19,800 | 43–32 |
| 76 | March 30 | Minnesota | W 125–102 | Gary Trent Jr. (29) | Pascal Siakam (10) | Pascal Siakam (13) | Scotiabank Arena; 19,800 | 44–32 |

April: 4–2 (home: 3–1; road: 1–1)

| Game | Date | Team | Score | High points | High rebounds | High assists | Location Attendance | Record |
|---|---|---|---|---|---|---|---|---|
| 77 | April 1 | @ Orlando | W 102–89 | Barnes, VanVleet (19) | Pascal Siakam (11) | Scottie Barnes (7) | Amway Center; 17,566 | 45–32 |
| 78 | April 3 | Miami | L 109–114 | Siakam, VanVleet (29) | Pascal Siakam (8) | Fred VanVleet (7) | Scotiabank Arena; 19,800 | 45–33 |
| 79 | April 5 | Atlanta | W 118–108 | Pascal Siakam (31) | Scottie Barnes (14) | Fred VanVleet (9) | Scotiabank Arena; 19,800 | 46–33 |
| 80 | April 7 | Philadelphia | W 119–114 | Pascal Siakam (37) | Pascal Siakam (11) | Pascal Siakam (12) | Scotiabank Arena; 19,800 | 47–33 |
| 81 | April 8 | Houston | W 117–115 | Pascal Siakam (29) | Pascal Siakam (12) | Pascal Siakam (7) | Scotiabank Arena; 19,800 | 48–33 |
| 82 | April 10 | @ New York | L 94–105 | Chris Boucher (21) | OG Anunoby (9) | Scottie Barnes (5) | Madison Square Garden; 19,812 | 48–34 |

2021–22 season schedule

=== Playoffs ===
2022 playoff game log
Total: 2–4 (home: 1–2; road: 1–2)
First Round: 2–4 (home: 1–2; road: 1–2)

| Game | Date | Team | Score | High points | High rebounds | High assists | Location Attendance | Series |
|---|---|---|---|---|---|---|---|---|
| 1 | April 16 | @ Philadelphia | L 111–131 | Pascal Siakam (24) | Scottie Barnes (10) | Scottie Barnes (8) | Wells Fargo Center; 20,610 | 0–1 |
| 2 | April 18 | @ Philadelphia | L 97–112 | OG Anunoby (26) | Pascal Siakam (10) | Fred VanVleet (7) | Wells Fargo Center; 20,974 | 0–2 |
| 3 | April 20 | Philadelphia | L 101–104 (OT) | OG Anunoby (26) | Achiuwa, Boucher (6) | Fred VanVleet (9) | Scotiabank Arena; 19,800 | 0–3 |
| 4 | April 23 | Philadelphia | W 110–102 | Pascal Siakam (34) | Scottie Barnes (11) | Siakam, Young (5) | Scotiabank Arena; 19,800 | 1–3 |
| 5 | April 25 | @ Philadelphia | W 103–88 | Pascal Siakam (23) | Pascal Siakam (10) | Pascal Siakam (7) | Wells Fargo Center; 20,517 | 2–3 |
| 6 | April 28 | Philadelphia | L 97–132 | Chris Boucher (25) | Chris Boucher (10) | Pascal Siakam (7) | Scotiabank Arena; 19,800 | 2–4 |

2022 playoff schedule

== Player statistics ==
=== Regular season ===
| Player | POS | GP | GS | MP | REB | AST | STL | BLK | PTS | MPG | RPG | APG | SPG | BPG | PPG |
|---|---|---|---|---|---|---|---|---|---|---|---|---|---|---|---|
| Chris Boucher | SF | 80 | 9 | 1,690 | 494 | 25 | 49 | 75 | 754 | 21.1 | 6.2 | .3 | .6 | .9 | 9.4 |
| Scottie Barnes | PF | 74 | 74 | 2,617 | 557 | 256 | 80 | 55 | 1,134 | 35.4 | 7.5 | 3.5 | 1.1 | .7 | 15.3 |
| Precious Achiuwa | C | 73 | 28 | 1,725 | 473 | 82 | 37 | 41 | 664 | 23.6 | 6.5 | 1.1 | .5 | .6 | 9.1 |
| Gary Trent Jr. | SG | 70 | 69 | 2,448 | 191 | 141 | 122 | 19 | 1,283 | 35.0 | 2.7 | 2.0 | 1.7 | .3 | 18.3 |
| Pascal Siakam | PF | 68 | 68 | 2,578 | 580 | 360 | 85 | 42 | 1,551 | 37.9 | 8.5 | 5.3 | 1.3 | .6 | 22.8 |
| Fred VanVleet | PG | 65 | 65 | 2,462 | 289 | 434 | 111 | 35 | 1,320 | 37.9 | 4.4 | 6.7 | 1.7 | .5 | 20.3 |
| Dalano Banton | PG | 64 | 1 | 696 | 124 | 99 | 28 | 10 | 205 | 10.9 | 1.9 | 1.5 | .4 | .2 | 3.2 |
| Sviatoslav Mykhailiuk | SF | 56 | 5 | 716 | 92 | 45 | 26 | 4 | 255 | 12.8 | 1.6 | .8 | .5 | .1 | 4.6 |
| Khem Birch | C | 55 | 28 | 991 | 239 | 56 | 30 | 26 | 247 | 18.0 | 4.3 | 1.0 | .5 | .5 | 4.5 |
| OG Anunoby | SF | 48 | 48 | 1,728 | 264 | 125 | 71 | 25 | 822 | 36.0 | 5.5 | 2.6 | 1.5 | .5 | 17.1 |
| Malachi Flynn | PG | 44 | 5 | 537 | 63 | 70 | 20 | 4 | 189 | 12.2 | 1.4 | 1.6 | .5 | .1 | 4.3 |
| Yuta Watanabe | SF | 38 | 4 | 445 | 92 | 21 | 11 | 16 | 163 | 11.7 | 2.4 | .6 | .3 | .4 | 4.3 |
| Justin Champagnie | SF | 36 | 0 | 281 | 72 | 11 | 8 | 4 | 81 | 7.8 | 2.0 | .3 | .2 | .1 | 2.3 |
| Thaddeus Young^{†} | PF | 26 | 0 | 475 | 115 | 45 | 31 | 11 | 164 | 18.3 | 4.4 | 1.7 | 1.2 | .4 | 6.3 |
| Isaac Bonga | SF | 15 | 0 | 69 | 7 | 4 | 8 | 2 | 12 | 4.6 | .5 | .3 | .5 | .1 | .8 |
| Armoni Brooks^{†} | PG | 13 | 3 | 154 | 22 | 13 | 7 | 3 | 34 | 11.8 | 1.7 | 1.0 | .5 | .2 | 2.6 |
| Goran Dragić^{†} | PG | 5 | 2 | 90 | 14 | 9 | 5 | 1 | 40 | 18.0 | 2.8 | 1.8 | 1.0 | .2 | 8.0 |
| D. J. Wilson | PF | 4 | 1 | 54 | 16 | 5 | 5 | 1 | 30 | 13.5 | 4.0 | 1.3 | 1.3 | .3 | 7.5 |
| Daniel Oturu | C | 3 | 0 | 27 | 5 | 0 | 0 | 2 | 9 | 9.0 | 1.7 | .0 | .0 | .7 | 3.0 |
| Tremont Waters^{†} | PG | 2 | 0 | 42 | 4 | 7 | 4 | 0 | 8 | 21.0 | 2.0 | 3.5 | 2.0 | .0 | 4.0 |
| David Johnson | SG | 2 | 0 | 2 | 0 | 0 | 0 | 0 | 0 | 1.0 | .0 | .0 | .0 | .0 | .0 |
| Juwan Morgan^{†} | PF | 1 | 0 | 27 | 4 | 1 | 0 | 0 | 5 | 27.0 | 4.0 | 1.0 | .0 | .0 | 5.0 |
| Sam Dekker | PF | 1 | 0 | 1 | 0 | 0 | 0 | 0 | 0 | 1.0 | .0 | .0 | .0 | .0 | .0 |

- ^{†} Denotes player spent time with another team in the season. Stats reflect time with the Raptors only.

=== Playoffs ===
| Player | POS | GP | GS | MP | REB | AST | STL | BLK | PTS | MPG | RPG | APG | SPG | BPG | PPG |
|---|---|---|---|---|---|---|---|---|---|---|---|---|---|---|---|
| Pascal Siakam | PF | 6 | 6 | 260 | 43 | 35 | 7 | 6 | 137 | 43.3 | 7.2 | 5.8 | 1.2 | 1.0 | 22.8 |
| OG Anunoby | SF | 6 | 6 | 217 | 24 | 15 | 6 | 1 | 104 | 36.2 | 4.0 | 2.5 | 1.0 | .2 | 17.3 |
| Gary Trent Jr. | SG | 6 | 6 | 199 | 10 | 8 | 6 | 3 | 92 | 33.2 | 1.7 | 1.3 | 1.0 | .5 | 15.3 |
| Khem Birch | C | 6 | 4 | 63 | 9 | 3 | 1 | 1 | 18 | 10.5 | 1.5 | .5 | .2 | .2 | 3.0 |
| Precious Achiuwa | C | 6 | 1 | 167 | 29 | 6 | 1 | 5 | 61 | 27.8 | 4.8 | 1.0 | .2 | .8 | 10.2 |
| Chris Boucher | SF | 6 | 0 | 130 | 35 | 1 | 1 | 7 | 67 | 21.7 | 5.8 | .2 | .2 | 1.2 | 11.2 |
| Thaddeus Young | PF | 6 | 0 | 87 | 18 | 10 | 5 | 1 | 20 | 14.5 | 3.0 | 1.7 | .8 | .2 | 3.3 |
| Malachi Flynn | PG | 6 | 0 | 36 | 3 | 3 | 1 | 0 | 0 | 6.0 | .5 | .5 | .2 | .0 | .0 |
| Fred VanVleet | PG | 4 | 4 | 140 | 12 | 25 | 7 | 4 | 55 | 35.0 | 3.0 | 6.3 | 1.8 | 1.0 | 13.8 |
| Scottie Barnes | PF | 4 | 3 | 133 | 36 | 17 | 4 | 1 | 51 | 33.3 | 9.0 | 4.3 | 1.0 | .3 | 12.8 |
| Yuta Watanabe | SF | 4 | 0 | 10 | 0 | 0 | 0 | 0 | 4 | 2.5 | .0 | .0 | .0 | .0 | 1.0 |
| Dalano Banton | PG | 4 | 0 | 8 | 2 | 1 | 1 | 0 | 7 | 2.0 | .5 | .3 | .3 | .0 | 1.8 |
| Armoni Brooks | PG | 4 | 0 | 8 | 2 | 0 | 0 | 0 | 0 | 2.0 | .5 | .0 | .0 | .0 | .0 |
| Sviatoslav Mykhailiuk | SF | 3 | 0 | 5 | 1 | 0 | 0 | 0 | 1 | 1.7 | .3 | .0 | .0 | .0 | .3 |
| Isaac Bonga | SF | 1 | 0 | 3 | 1 | 0 | 0 | 0 | 2 | 3.0 | 1.0 | .0 | .0 | .0 | 2.0 |

== Transactions ==
=== Overview ===
Players Added

Via draft

- Scottie Barnes
- Dalano Banton
- David Johnson

Via trade

- Goran Dragić
- Precious Achiuwa

Via free agency

- Sam Dekker
- Ish Wainright
- Justin Champagnie
- Isaac Bonga
- Svi Mykhailiuk
Players Lost

Via trade

- Kyle Lowry

Waived

- Paul Watson
- Rodney Hood
- DeAndre' Bembry
- Aron Baynes

=== Trades ===
| To Miami Heat: Kyle Lowry (sign-and-trade) | To Toronto Raptors: Precious Achiuwa; Goran Dragić |
| To San Antonio Spurs: Goran Dragić; 2022 protected first-round pick (Note: San Antonio will receive in 2022 if it is No. 15–30, in 2023 if it is No. 14–30; if the pick is not conveyed by 2023, it will convert to Toronto's second-round picks in 2023 and 2026.) | To Toronto Raptors: Drew Eubanks; Thaddeus Young; 2022 second-round pick (Note: The better of the picks originally belonging to Chicago and Detroit.) |

=== Free agency ===
==== Re-signed ====
| Date | Player | Contract terms | Ref. |
|---|---|---|---|
| August 6 | Khem Birch | 3 year $20 million | |
| August 8 | Gary Trent Jr. | 3 year $54 million | |

==== Additions ====
| Date | Player | Contract terms | Former team | Ref. |
|---|---|---|---|---|
| August 7 | Ish Wainright | 2 year minimum | SIG Strasbourg | |
| August 7 | Justin Champagnie | Two-way contract | Pittsburgh | |
| August 9 | Sam Dekker | 1 year minimum | Türk Telekom B.K. | |
| August 11 | Isaac Bonga | 1 year minimum | Washington Wizards | |
| August 31 | Svi Mykhailiuk | 2 year minimum | Oklahoma City Thunder | |
| TBA | Juwan Morgan | 10-day contract | Maine Celtics (G League) | |
| TBA | Brandon Goodwin | 10-day contract | Westchester Knicks (G League) | |
| TBA | Nik Stauskas | 10-day contract | Grand Rapids Gold (G League) | |
| TBA | Tremont Waters | 10-day contract | Wisconsin Herd (G League) | |
| TBA | D. J. Wilson | 10-day contract | Oklahoma City Blue (G League) | |

==== Subtractions ====
| Date | Player | Reason | New team | Ref. |
|---|---|---|---|---|
| August 3 | Paul Watson | Waived | Oklahoma City Thunder | |
| August 3 | Rodney Hood | Waived | Milwaukee Bucks | |
| August 3 | DeAndre' Bembry | Waived | Brooklyn Nets | |
| August 4 | Aron Baynes | Waived | | |
| November 6 | Sam Dekker | Waived | Bahçeşehir Koleji (Turkey) | |
