= 2021–22 Orlando Magic season =

- Head coach: Jamahl Mosley
- General manager: John Hammond
- Owners: RDV Sports, Inc.
- Arena: Amway Center

Results
- Record: 22–60 (.268)
- Place: Division: 5th (Southeast); Conference: 15th (Eastern)
- Playoff finish: Did not qualify
- Stats at Basketball Reference

Local media
- Television: Bally Sports Florida
- Radio: 96.9 The Game

The 2021–22 Orlando Magic season was the 33rd season of the franchise in the National Basketball Association (NBA). This was the first season since 2018 that Steve Clifford did not coach the Magic, after agreeing to part ways on June 5. On July 11, 2021 Jamahl Mosley was hired as the new head coach. On March 12, 2022, the Magic were eliminated from playoff contention, making it the second consecutive season that they did not make the playoffs.

== Draft picks ==
Round	Pick	Player	Position	Nationality	School/club team
1	5	Jalen Suggs	Guard	United States	Gonzaga (Fr.)
1	8	Franz Wagner	Small forward	Germany	Michigan (So.)
2	33	Jason Preston	Point guard	United States	Ohio (Jr.)

The Magic entered the draft with two first-round picks (including the 8th pick, which was conveyed from the Chicago Bulls because it fell outside its top-4 protection from the 2021 Nikola Vučević trade) and one second-round pick.

In the draft, the Magic selected Jalen Suggs from Gonzaga University with the fifth pick. The team also selected Franz Wagner from the University of Michigan with the eighth pick, and Jason Preston from Ohio University with the thirty-third pick. The draft rights to Preston was later traded to the Los Angeles Clippers.

== Roster ==
2021–22 Orlando Magic roster
Players

Pos.	No.	Player	Height	Weight	DOB	From
G	50	Cole Anthony	6 ft 3 in (1.91 m)	185 lb (84 kg)	2000-05-15	North Carolina
C	5	Mo Bamba	7 ft 0 in (2.13 m)	231 lb (105 kg)	1998-05-12	Texas
F/C	10	Bol Bol (injured)	7 ft 2 in (2.18 m)	220 lb (100 kg)	1999-11-16	Oregon
F	17	Ignas Brazdeikis (TW)	6 ft 7 in (2.01 m)	221 lb (100 kg)	1999-01-08	Michigan
G	30	Devin Cannady	6 ft 2 in (1.88 m)	185 lb (84 kg)	1996-05-21	Princeton
C	34	Wendell Carter Jr.	6 ft 10 in (2.08 m)	270 lb (122 kg)	1999-04-16	Duke
G	20	Markelle Fultz	6 ft 3 in (1.91 m)	209 lb (95 kg)	1998-05-29	Washington
G	13	R. J. Hampton	6 ft 4 in (1.93 m)	175 lb (79 kg)	2001-02-07	Little Elm HS (TX)
G	14	Gary Harris	6 ft 4 in (1.93 m)	210 lb (95 kg)	1994-09-14	Michigan State
F	1	Jonathan Isaac (injured)	6 ft 11 in (2.11 m)	230 lb (104 kg)	1997-10-03	Florida State
F	3	Chuma Okeke	6 ft 7 in (2.01 m)	229 lb (104 kg)	1998-08-18	Auburn
G/F	31	Terrence Ross	6 ft 7 in (2.01 m)	206 lb (93 kg)	1991-02-05	Washington
F	25	Admiral Schofield (TW)	6 ft 5 in (1.96 m)	241 lb (109 kg)	1997-03-30	Tennessee
G	4	Jalen Suggs	6 ft 5 in (1.96 m)	205 lb (93 kg)	2001-06-03	Gonzaga
F	22	Franz Wagner	6 ft 10 in (2.08 m)	220 lb (100 kg)	2001-08-27	Michigan
F/C	21	Moritz Wagner	6 ft 11 in (2.11 m)	245 lb (111 kg)	1997-04-26	Michigan

Coaches
Head coach
- Jamahl Mosley
Assistant(s)
- Bret Brielmaier
- Lionel Chalmers
- Bruce Kreutzer
- Jesse Mermuys
- Dylan Murphy
- Dale Osbourne
- Nate Tibbetts

Legend
- (DP) Unsigned draft pick
- (FA) Free agent
- (S) Suspended
- (GL) On assignment to G League affiliate
- (TW) Two-way affiliate player
- Injured

Roster
Updated: April 10, 2022

== Standings ==
=== Division ===
Southeast Division	W	L	PCT	GB	Home	Road	Div	GP
c – Miami Heat	53	29	.646	–	29‍–‍12	24‍–‍17	13–3	82
x − Atlanta Hawks	43	39	.524	10.0	27‍–‍14	16‍–‍25	9–7	82
pi − Charlotte Hornets	43	39	.524	10.0	22‍–‍19	21‍–‍20	8–8	82
Washington Wizards	35	47	.427	18.0	21‍–‍20	14‍–‍27	7–9	82
Orlando Magic	22	60	.268	31.0	12‍–‍29	10‍–‍31	3–13	82

=== Conference ===
Eastern Conference
#	Team	W	L	PCT	GB	GP
1	c – Miami Heat *	53	29	.646	–	82
2	y – Boston Celtics *	51	31	.622	2.0	82
3	y – Milwaukee Bucks *	51	31	.622	2.0	82
4	x – Philadelphia 76ers	51	31	.622	2.0	82
5	x – Toronto Raptors	48	34	.585	5.0	82
6	x – Chicago Bulls	46	36	.561	7.0	82
7	x − Brooklyn Nets	44	38	.537	9.0	82
8	pi − Cleveland Cavaliers	44	38	.537	9.0	82
9	x − Atlanta Hawks	43	39	.524	10.0	82
10	pi − Charlotte Hornets	43	39	.524	10.0	82
11	New York Knicks	37	45	.451	16.0	82
12	Washington Wizards	35	47	.427	18.0	82
13	Indiana Pacers	25	57	.305	28.0	82
14	Detroit Pistons	23	59	.280	30.0	82
15	Orlando Magic	22	60	.268	31.0	82

== Game log ==
=== Preseason ===
2021 preseason game log
Total: 1–3 (Home: 1–1; Road: 0–2)
Preseason: 1–3 (home: 1–1; road: 0–2)

Game	Date	Team	Score	High points	High rebounds	High assists	Location Attendance	Record
1	October 4	@ Boston	L 97–98	Anthony, Wagner (16)	Mo Bamba (10)	Cole Anthony (6)	TD Garden; 19,156	0–1
2	October 6	@ New Orleans	L 86–104	Wendell Carter Jr. (13)	Wendell Carter Jr. (11)	Anthony, Brazdeikis, Dowtin, Lopez, Suggs, F. Wagner, M. Wagner (2)	Smoothie King Center; 12,407	0–2
3	October 10	San Antonio	L 100–101	Terrence Ross (20)	Mo Bamba (10)	Cole Anthony (5)	Amway Center; 12,509	0–3
4	October 13	Boston	W 103–102	R. J. Hampton (20)	Wendell Carter Jr. (9)	Terrence Ross (5)	Amway Center; 13,519	1–3

2021–22 pre-season schedule

=== Regular season ===
2021–22 game log
Total: 22–60 (Home: 12–29; Road: 10–31)
October: 1–6 (home: 0–2; road: 1–4)

Game	Date	Team	Score	High points	High rebounds	High assists	Location Attendance	Record
1	October 20	@ San Antonio	L 97–123	Mo Bamba (18)	Wendell Carter Jr. (8)	Anthony, Bamba (4)	AT&T Center; 16,697	0–1
2	October 22	New York	L 96–121	Franz Wagner (16)	Mo Bamba (10)	Jalen Suggs (8)	Amway Center; 18,846	0–2
3	October 24	@ New York	W 110–104	Cole Anthony (29)	Cole Anthony (16)	Cole Anthony (8)	Madison Square Garden; 16,273	1–2
4	October 25	@ Miami	L 90–107	F. Wagner, Suggs (15)	Cole Anthony (9)	Cole Anthony (5)	FTX Arena; 19,600	1–3
5	October 27	Charlotte	L 111–120	Cole Anthony (24)	Bamba, Carter Jr. (10)	Cole Anthony (6)	Amway Center; 14,082	1–4
6	October 29	@ Toronto	L 109–110	Cole Anthony (24)	Mo Bamba (18)	Anthony, Bamba (5)	Scotiabank Arena; 19,800	1–5
7	October 30	@ Detroit	L 103–110	F. Wagner (19)	Cole Anthony (10)	Jalen Suggs (6)	Little Caesars Arena; 11,423	1–6

November: 3–12 (home: 1–6; road: 2–6)

Game	Date	Team	Score	High points	High rebounds	High assists	Location Attendance	Record
8	November 1	@ Minnesota	W 115–97	Cole Anthony (31)	Wendell Carter Jr. (14)	Cole Anthony (8)	Target Center; 14,744	2–6
9	November 3	Boston	L 79–92	Anthony, Carter Jr. (13)	Wendell Carter Jr. (13)	Anthony, Carter Jr. (4)	Amway Center; 12,735	2–7
10	November 5	San Antonio	L 89–102	Cole Anthony (21)	Wendell Carter Jr. (10)	Cole Anthony (6)	Amway Center; 14,101	2–8
11	November 7	Utah	W 107–100	Cole Anthony (33)	Wendell Carter Jr. (16)	Wendell Carter Jr. (6)	Amway Center; 13,386	3–8
12	November 10	Brooklyn	L 90–123	Terrence Ross (17)	Mo Bamba (9)	Jalen Suggs (4)	Amway Center; 13,882	3–9
13	November 13	Washington	L 92–104	Cole Anthony (22)	Mo Bamba (17)	Cole Anthony (8)	Amway Center; 17,272	3–10
14	November 15	@ Atlanta	L 111–129	Cole Anthony (29)	Wendell Carter Jr. (9)	Cole Anthony (11)	State Farm Arena; 13,061	3–11
15	November 17	@ New York	W 104–98	Terrence Ross (19)	Mo Bamba (12)	Cole Anthony (7)	Madison Square Garden; 16,680	4–11
16	November 19	@ Brooklyn	L 113–115	Jalen Suggs (21)	Mo Bamba (10)	Cole Anthony (9)	Barclays Center; 16,966	4–12
17	November 20	@ Milwaukee	L 108–117	R. J. Hampton (19)	Mo Bamba (7)	R. J. Hampton (9)	Fiserv Forum; 17,341	4–13
18	November 22	@ Milwaukee	L 92–123	Moritz Wagner (18)	Wendell Carter Jr. (10)	R. J. Hampton (5)	Fiserv Forum; 17,341	4–14
19	November 24	Charlotte	L 99–106	Mo Bamba (18)	Mo Bamba (12)	Hampton, Suggs (6)	Amway Center; 16,114	4–15
20	November 26	Chicago	L 88–123	Wendell Carter Jr. (26)	Wendell Carter Jr. (10)	Harris, F. Wagner (4)	Amway Center; 18,236	4–16
21	November 27	@ Cleveland	L 92–105	Wendell Carter Jr. (19)	Wendell Carter Jr. (11)	Lopez, F. Wagner (4)	Rocket Mortgage FieldHouse; 18,248	4–17
22	November 29	@ Philadelphia	L 96–101	Franz Wagner (27)	Mo Bamba (17)	Suggs, F. Wagner (5)	Wells Fargo Center; 20,193	4–18

December: 3–11 (home: 1–5; road: 2–6)

Game	Date	Team	Score	High points	High rebounds	High assists	Location Attendance	Record
23	December 1	Denver	W 108–103	Cole Anthony (24)	Anthony, Carter Jr. (8)	Cole Anthony (7)	Amway Center; 14,191	5–18
24	December 3	@ Houston	L 116–118	Cole Anthony (26)	Wendell Carter Jr. (16)	Cole Anthony (7)	Toyota Center; 13,697	5–19
25	December 6	@ Golden State	L 95–126	Gary Harris (17)	Wendell Carter Jr. (12)	Franz Wagner (6)	Chase Center; 18,064	5–20
26	December 8	@ Sacramento	L 130–142	Cole Anthony (33)	Wendell Carter Jr. (10)	Cole Anthony (8)	Golden 1 Center; 14,364	5–21
27	December 11	@ L. A. Clippers	L 104–106	Cole Anthony (23)	Wendell Carter Jr. (14)	Wendell Carter Jr. (7)	Staples Center; 17,156	5–22
28	December 12	@ L. A. Lakers	L 94–106	Cole Anthony (21)	Robin Lopez (9)	Cole Anthony (5)	Staples Center; 18,997	5–23
29	December 15	Atlanta	L 99–111	Moritz Wagner (19)	Wendell Carter Jr. (15)	Terrence Ross (8)	Amway Center; 13,576	5–24
30	December 17	Miami	L 105–115	Franz Wagner (27)	Chuma Okeke (10)	Gary Harris (5)	Amway Center; 14,103	5–25
31	December 18	@ Brooklyn	W 100–93	Robin Lopez (20)	Franz Wagner (11)	Franz Wagner (6)	Barclays Center; 16,292	6–25
—	December 20	@ Toronto	Postponed due to Magic players and staff members entering the NBA's Health and Safety Protocols. Makeup date: March 4.					
32	December 22	@ Atlanta	W 104–98	Franz Wagner (25)	Freddie Gillespie (8)	Robin Lopez (11)	State Farm Arena; 15,299	7–25
33	December 23	New Orleans	L 104–110	Anthony, Harris (22)	Wendell Carter Jr. (12)	Cole Anthony (11)	Amway Center; 13,954	7–26
34	December 26	@ Miami	L 83–93	Gary Harris (20)	Wendell Carter Jr. (14)	R. J. Hampton (5)	FTX Arena; 19,600	7–27
35	December 28	Milwaukee	L 110–127	Franz Wagner (38)	Wendell Carter Jr. (10)	Gravett, Hampton, Harris, Lopez (4)	Amway Center; 16,696	7–28
36	December 30	Milwaukee	L 118–136	Franz Wagner (20)	Wendell Carter Jr. (10)	Carter Jr., Frazier, Hampton (5)	Amway Center; 15,855	7–29

January: 4–11 (home: 3–5; road: 1–6)

Game	Date	Team	Score	High points	High rebounds	High assists	Location Attendance	Record
37	January 2	@ Boston	L 111–116 (OT)	Terrence Ross (33)	Wendell Carter Jr. (16)	Wendell Carter Jr. (7)	TD Garden; 19,156	7–30
38	January 3	@ Chicago	L 98–102	Franz Wagner (22)	Wendell Carter Jr. (10)	Wendell Carter Jr. (10)	United Center; 20,502	7–31
39	January 5	Philadelphia	L 106–116	Cole Anthony (26)	Wendell Carter Jr. (10)	Cole Anthony (7)	Amway Center; 13,116	7–32
40	January 8	@ Detroit	L 92–97	Gary Harris (28)	Chuma Okeke (10)	Cole Anthony (6)	Little Caesars Arena; 18,644	7–33
41	January 9	Washington	L 100–102	Terrence Ross (32)	Mo Bamba (9)	Chuma Okeke (5)	Amway Center; 13,223	7–34
42	January 12	@ Washington	L 106–112	Cole Anthony (19)	Anthony, Lopez (11)	Franz Wagner (10)	Capital One Arena; 13,138	7–35
43	January 14	@ Charlotte	W 116–109	Moritz Wagner (26)	Chuma Okeke (10)	Cole Anthony (8)	Spectrum Center; 16,011	8–35
44	January 15	@ Dallas	L 92–108	Lopez, Suggs, M. Wagner (16)	Bamba, Okeke (6)	Anthony, F. Wagner (3)	American Airlines Center; 19,816	8–36
45	January 17	Portland	L 88–98	F. Wagner, M. Wagner (14)	Anthony, Bamba (9)	Cole Anthony (6)	Amway Center; 13,648	8–37
46	January 19	@ Philadelphia	L 110–123	Mo Bamba (32)	Franz Wagner (11)	Cole Anthony (8)	Wells Fargo Center; 20,081	8–38
47	January 21	L. A. Lakers	L 105–116	Jalen Suggs (22)	Mo Bamba (8)	Jalen Suggs (9)	Amway Center; 18,846	8–39
48	January 23	Chicago	W 114–95	Moritz Wagner (23)	Carter Jr., Okeke (7)	Jalen Suggs (7)	Amway Center; 18,846	9–39
49	January 26	L. A. Clippers	L 102–111	Franz Wagner (21)	Wendell Carter Jr. (9)	Cole Anthony (11)	Amway Center; 12,448	9–40
50	January 28	Detroit	W 119–103	Franz Wagner (24)	Bamba, Carter Jr. (11)	Cole Anthony (9)	Amway Center; 13,156	10–40
51	January 30	Dallas	W 110–108	Chuma Okeke (19)	Wendell Carter Jr. (14)	Cole Anthony (6)	Amway Center; 13,376	11–40

February: 4–7 (home: 2–3; road: 2–4)

Game	Date	Team	Score	High points	High rebounds	High assists	Location Attendance	Record
52	February 1	@ Chicago	L 115–126	Wendell Carter Jr. (24)	Bamba, Carter Jr. (8)	Cole Anthony (9)	United Center; 20,217	11–41
53	February 2	@ Indiana	W 119–118	Gary Harris (22)	Wendell Carter Jr. (18)	Anthony, Suggs (8)	Bankers Life Fieldhouse; 14,528	12–41
54	February 5	Memphis	L 115–135	Cole Anthony (22)	Wendell Carter Jr. (10)	Anthony, Suggs (5)	Amway Center; 18,846	12–42
55	February 6	Boston	L 83–116	Jalen Suggs (17)	Mo Bamba (10)	Jalen Suggs (5)	Amway Center; 14,402	12–43
56	February 8	@ Portland	W 113–95	Cole Anthony (23)	Bamba, F. Wagner (9)	Cole Anthony (9)	Moda Center; 16,024	13–43
57	February 11	@ Utah	L 99–114	Wendell Carter Jr. (22)	Wendell Carter Jr. (9)	Jalen Suggs (7)	Vivint Arena; 18,306	13–44
58	February 12	@ Phoenix	L 105–132	Jalen Suggs (20)	Wendell Carter Jr. (11)	Jalen Suggs (10)	Footprint Center; 17,071	13–45
59	February 14	@ Denver	L 111–121	Franz Wagner (26)	Wendell Carter Jr. (12)	Carter Jr., Okeke, F. Wagner (4)	Ball Arena; 15,025	13–46
60	February 16	Atlanta	L 109–130	Cole Anthony (23)	Wendell Carter Jr. (10)	Wendell Carter Jr. (6)	Amway Center; 14,398	13–47
All-Star Break
61	February 25	Houston	W 119–111	Wendell Carter Jr. (24)	Wendell Carter Jr. (12)	Cole Anthony (6)	Amway Center; 16,631	14–47
62	February 28	Indiana	W 119–103	Wendell Carter Jr. (21)	Wendell Carter Jr. (12)	Jalen Suggs (10)	Amway Center; 13,014	15–47

March: 5–10 (home: 3–6; road: 2–4)

Game	Date	Team	Score	High points	High rebounds	High assists	Location Attendance	Record
63	March 2	Indiana	L 114–122 (OT)	Franz Wagner (28)	Wendell Carter Jr. (18)	Carter Jr., Suggs (5)	Amway Center; 11,121	15–48
64	March 4	@ Toronto	W 103–97	Anthony, Suggs (15)	Cole Anthony (12)	Jalen Suggs (7)	Scotiabank Arena; 19,081	16–48
65	March 5	@ Memphis	L 96–124	Cole Anthony (19)	Moritz Wagner (11)	Franz Wagner (6)	FedExForum; 17,794	16–49
66	March 8	Phoenix	L 99–102	Wendell Carter Jr. (20)	Mo Bamba (15)	Cole Anthony (5)	Amway Center; 14,024	16–50
67	March 9	@ New Orleans	W 108–102	Cole Anthony (19)	Moritz Wagner (9)	Anthony, Carter Jr. (5)	Smoothie King Center; 15,633	17–50
68	March 11	Minnesota	W 118–110	Mo Bamba (27)	Mo Bamba (12)	Markelle Fultz (7)	Amway Center; 14,557	18–50
69	March 13	Philadelphia	L 114–116 (OT)	Wendell Carter Jr. (23)	Wendell Carter Jr. (12)	Markelle Fultz (11)	Amway Center; 14,444	18–51
70	March 15	Brooklyn	L 108–150	Cole Anthony (19)	Moritz Wagner (11)	Cole Anthony (7)	Amway Center; 15,282	18–52
71	March 17	Detroit	L 120–134	Franz Wagner (26)	Mo Bamba (12)	Cole Anthony (7)	Amway Center; 14,369	18–53
72	March 20	Oklahoma City	W 90–85	Wendell Carter Jr. (30)	Wendell Carter Jr. (16)	Cole Anthony (7)	Amway Center; 15,012	19–53
73	March 22	Golden State	W 94–90	Wendell Carter Jr. (19)	Wendell Carter Jr. (8)	Anthony, Hampton (5)	Amway Center; 17,164	20–53
74	March 23	@ Oklahoma City	L 102–118	Chuma Okeke (19)	Mo Bamba (10)	Cole Anthony (11)	Paycom Center; 14,393	20–54
75	March 26	Sacramento	L 110–114 (OT)	Franz Wagner (19)	Mo Bamba (13)	Cole Anthony (9)	Amway Center; 16,366	20–55
76	March 28	@ Cleveland	L 101–107	Wendell Carter Jr. (15)	Wendell Carter Jr. (12)	Carter Jr., F. Wagner (6)	Rocket Mortgage FieldHouse; 19,432	20–56
77	March 30	@ Washington	L 110–127	Franz Wagner (28)	Okeke, M. Wagner (8)	Markelle Fultz (7)	Capital One Arena; 16,455	20–57

April: 2–3 (home: 2–2; road: 0–1)

Game	Date	Team	Score	High points	High rebounds	High assists	Location Attendance	Record
78	April 1	Toronto	L 89–102	Mo Bamba (15)	Mo Bamba (10)	Markelle Fultz (7)	Amway Center; 17,566	20–58
79	April 3	New York	L 88–118	Moritz Wagner (18)	Mo Bamba (12)	Markelle Fultz (6)	Amway Center; 15,747	20–59
80	April 5	Cleveland	W 120–115	Mo Bamba (21)	Mo Bamba (12)	R. J. Hampton (7)	Amway Center; 16,897	21–59
81	April 7	@ Charlotte	L 101–128	Chuma Okeke (20)	R. J. Hampton (8)	Markelle Fultz (6)	Spectrum Center; 16,427	21–60
82	April 10	Miami	W 125–111	Bamba, Hampton (21)	Moritz Wagner (11)	Markelle Fultz (15)	Amway Center; 19,253	22–60

2021–22 season schedule

== Player statistics ==
=== Regular season ===
Player	POS	GP	GS	MP	REB	AST	STL	BLK	PTS	MPG	RPG	APG	SPG	BPG	PPG
Franz Wagner	SF	79	79	2,429	356	231	68	34	1,197	30.7	4.5	2.9	.9	.4	15.2
Mo Bamba	C	71	69	1,824	572	85	38	118	756	25.7	8.1	1.2	.5	1.7	10.6
Chuma Okeke	PF	70	20	1,749	347	118	97	42	605	25.0	5.0	1.7	1.4	.6	8.6
Cole Anthony	PG	65	65	2,059	348	369	46	17	1,062	31.7	5.4	5.7	.7	.3	16.3
R. J. Hampton	SG	64	14	1,402	194	158	42	13	489	21.9	3.0	2.5	.7	.2	7.6
Moritz Wagner	C	63	3	960	232	87	20	13	564	15.2	3.7	1.4	.3	.2	9.0
Terrence Ross	SG	63	0	1,448	161	116	28	12	629	23.0	2.6	1.8	.4	.2	10.0
Wendell Carter Jr.	PF	62	61	1,852	648	171	36	43	931	29.9	10.5	2.8	.6	.7	15.0
Gary Harris	SG	61	30	1,730	122	108	59	9	679	28.4	2.0	1.8	1.0	.1	11.1
Jalen Suggs	PG	48	45	1,307	171	209	59	19	564	27.2	3.6	4.4	1.2	.4	11.8
Ignas Brazdeikis	SF	42	1	536	72	37	10	3	210	12.8	1.7	.9	.2	.1	5.0
Admiral Schofield	SF	38	1	469	89	25	4	5	146	12.3	2.3	.7	.1	.1	3.8
Robin Lopez	C	36	9	612	126	54	2	18	254	17.0	3.5	1.5	.1	.5	7.1
Markelle Fultz	PG	18	3	360	49	99	20	5	195	20.0	2.7	5.5	1.1	.3	10.8
Mychal Mulder^{†}	PG	15	2	195	21	3	4	1	55	13.0	1.4	.2	.3	.1	3.7
Tim Frazier^{†}	PG	10	3	200	19	33	3	1	37	20.0	1.9	3.3	.3	.1	3.7
Freddie Gillespie	PF	9	2	119	36	5	3	9	21	13.2	4.0	.6	.3	1.0	2.3
Hassani Gravett	PG	8	3	171	21	20	5	1	50	21.4	2.6	2.5	.6	.1	6.3
Devin Cannady	PG	5	0	145	6	10	5	3	50	29.0	1.2	2.0	1.0	.6	10.0
Aleem Ford	SF	5	0	74	15	2	1	0	14	14.8	3.0	.4	.2	.0	2.8
Jeff Dowtin^{†}	PG	4	0	77	11	7	5	0	13	19.3	2.8	1.8	1.3	.0	3.3
B. J. Johnson	SF	4	0	65	15	0	0	1	26	16.3	3.8	.0	.0	.3	6.5

- ^{†} Denotes player spent time with another team in the season. Stats reflect time with the Magic only.

== Transactions ==
=== Trades ===
July 29, 2021	To Orlando Magic 2026 second-round pick Cash considerations	To Los Angeles Clippers Draft rights to Jason Preston (No. 33)

=== Free agency ===
==== Additions ====
Player	Signed	Former team
Robin Lopez	1-year contract worth $5 million	Washington Wizards
Hassani Gravett	Exhibit 10 contract	(North Macedonia) MZT Skopje Aerodrom
Jeff Dowtin	Exhibit 10 contract	Lakeland Magic
Jon Teske	Exhibit 10 contract	(Belgium) Filou Oostende
E'Twaun Moore	1-year contract worth $2.6 million	Phoenix Suns
Admiral Schofield	1-year contract worth $1.4 million	Greensboro Swarm

==== Subtractions ====
Player	Reason left	New Team
Dwayne Bacon	Waived	New York Knicks
