= David Johnson (basketball) =

American basketball player (born 2001)

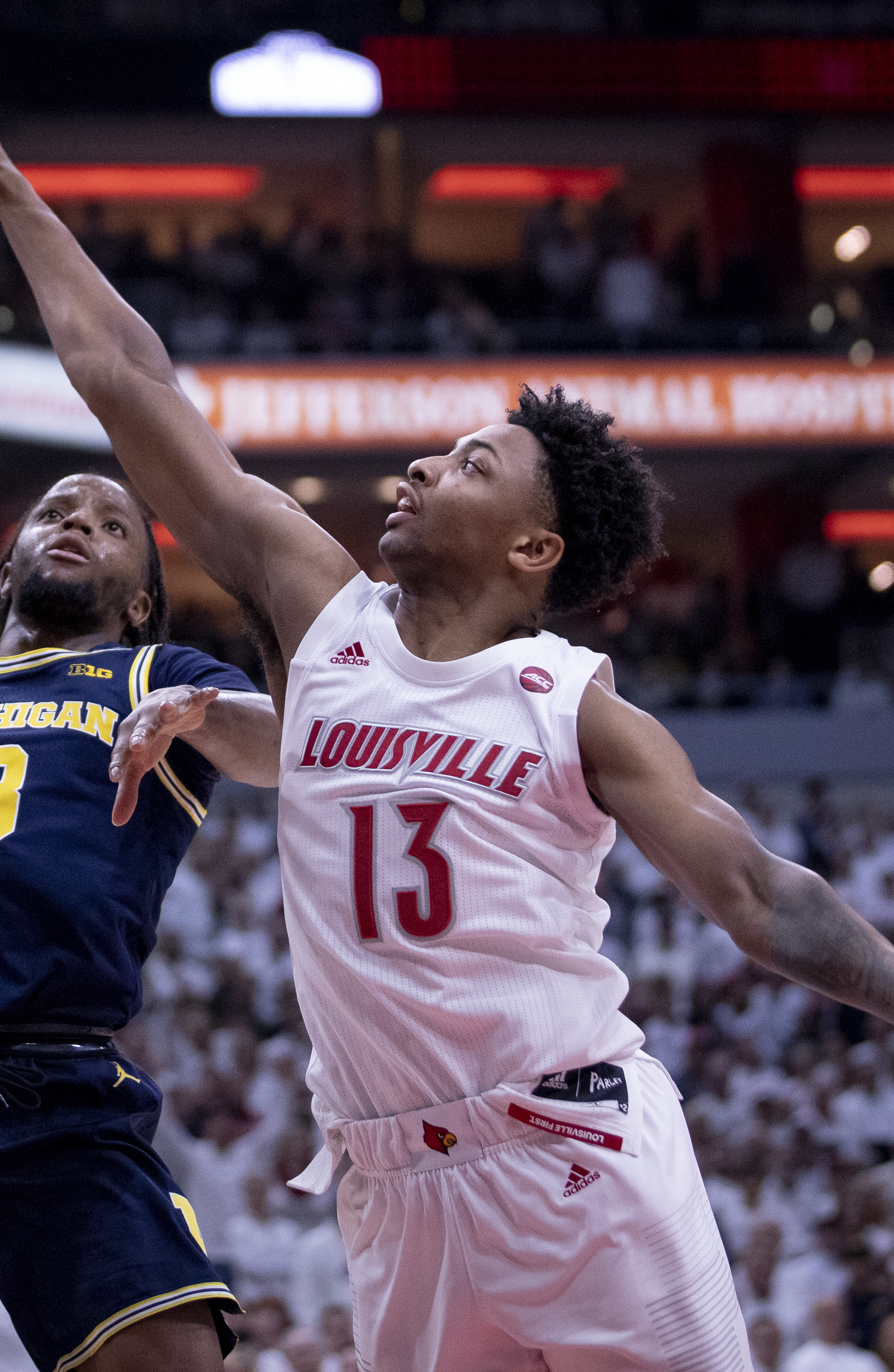
- Johnson with Louisville in 2019

No. 7 – Tasmania JackJumpers
- Position: Shooting guard
- League: NBL

Personal information
- Born: February 26, 2001 (age 25) Louisville, Kentucky, U.S.
- Listed height: 6 ft 4 in (1.93 m)
- Listed weight: 203 lb (92 kg)

Career information
- High school: Trinity (Louisville, Kentucky)
- College: Louisville (2019–2021)
- NBA draft: 2021: 2nd round, 47th overall pick
- Drafted by: Toronto Raptors
- Playing career: 2021–present

Career history
- 2021–2022: Toronto Raptors
- 2021–2022: →Raptors 905
- 2022–2023: Raptors 905
- 2023–2025: Memphis Hustle
- 2025–present: Tasmania JackJumpers
- Stats at NBA.com
- Stats at Basketball Reference

David Ricardo Johnson (born February 26, 2001) is an American professional basketball player for the Tasmania JackJumpers of the Australian National Basketball League (NBL). He played college basketball for the Louisville Cardinals, and was drafted by the Toronto Raptors in the second round of the 2021 NBA draft.

== Early life ==
Johnson grew up in Louisville, Kentucky, and attended Trinity High School. As a sophomore, Johnson averaged 10.5 points and 4.8 rebounds per game and was named third team All-State. He was named first team All-State as a junior after averaging 13.9 points, 5.8 rebounds and 5.2 assists per game. Johnson was ranked a four-star recruit and the best college prospect in the state of Kentucky by ESPN and committed to play at Louisville early during his senior year. He de-committed after Louisville was named as part of the 2017–18 NCAA Division I men's basketball corruption scandal, but recommitted after considering offers from Georgia and Xavier. As a senior, Johnson averaged 16.1 points, 7.2 rebounds and four assists per game and was named First Team All-State and the Player of the Year by the Lexington Herald-Leader. He was named the MVP of the Kentucky Sweet 16 state tournament after recording 22 points, 12 rebounds, two assists and four blocked shots in the state title game. He scored 1,472 points and grabbed 719 rebounds in four seasons as a starter at Trinity.

== College career ==
Johnson missed the beginning of his freshman season with an offseason shoulder injury. Johnson played mostly as a key reserve during his freshman season with occasional starts. He scored a season high 19 points with seven assists, four rebounds and three steals in Louisville's upset win over Duke on January 18, 2020. Johnson started at point guard against Syracuse on February 19, 2020, and led the team with seven assists in the 90–66 win in addition to three points. Johnson averaged 6.3 points, 2.8 assists and 2.8 rebounds per game in 27 games with four starts for the season. As a sophomore, he averaged 12.6 points, 3.2 assists and 5.8 rebounds per game. Following the season, he declared for the 2021 NBA draft, where he was a projected lottery pick.

== Professional career ==
=== Toronto Raptors and Raptors 905 (2021–2023) ===
Johnson was selected in the second round of the 2021 NBA draft with the 47th pick by the Toronto Raptors. On August 8, 2021, he signed a two-way contract with Toronto, splitting time with their NBA G League affiliate, Raptors 905. That month, he played for Toronto during the 2021 NBA Summer League. He played two NBA games for Toronto during the 2021–22 season, as well as 34 games in the G League for Raptors 905.

After playing for Toronto in the 2022 NBA Summer League, Johnson signed an Exhibit 10 contract on October 15, 2022, but was waived later that day. He then re-joined Raptors 905 for the 2022–23 NBA G League season.

Johnson played for the Toronto Raptors in the 2023 NBA Summer League.

=== Memphis Hustle (2023–2025) ===
On October 18, 2023, Johnson signed with the Memphis Grizzlies. However, he was waived three days later. He subsequently joined the Memphis Hustle for the 2023–24 NBA G League season.

On October 16, 2024, Johnson signed once again with the Grizzlies, but was waived the same day. He subsequently re-joined the Memphis Hustle for the 2024–25 NBA G League season.

=== Tasmania JackJumpers (2025–present) ===
On May 27, 2025, Johnson signed with the Tasmania JackJumpers of the Australian National Basketball League (NBL) for the 2025–26 season. On September 26, 2025, he was ruled out for four weeks after suffering a calf injury at practice. He missed an additional month after re-aggravating the injury during rehabilitation. On February 1, 2026, he had a game-high 33 points and seven 3-pointers in a 91–89 win over the New Zealand Breakers.

On June 5, 2026, Johnson re-signed with the JackJumpers for the 2026–27 NBL season. On October 31, 2026, he was sidelined with a calf injury. He returned to action on November 21.

== Career statistics ==
Legend
GP	Games played	GS	Games started	MPG	Minutes per game
FG%	Field goal percentage	3P%	3-point field goal percentage	FT%	Free throw percentage
RPG	Rebounds per game	APG	Assists per game	SPG	Steals per game
BPG	Blocks per game	PPG	Points per game	**Bold**	Career high

=== NBA ===
Year	Team	GP	GS	MPG	FG%	3P%	FT%	RPG	APG	SPG	BPG	PPG
2021–22	Toronto	2	0	1.0	.000	.000	–	.0	.0	.0	.0	.0
Career		2	0	1.0	.000	.000	–	.0	.0	.0	.0	.0

=== College ===
Year	Team	GP	GS	MPG	FG%	3P%	FT%	RPG	APG	SPG	BPG	PPG
2019–20	Louisville	**27**	4	16.0	**.493**	.217	.600	2.8	2.8	.7	**.3**	6.3
2020–21	Louisville	19	**19**	**35.1**	.411	**.386**	**.700**	**5.8**	**3.2**	**1.1**	**.3**	**12.6**
Career		46	23	23.9	.444	.349	.650	4.0	2.9	.8	.3	8.9

== Personal life ==
Johnson is a cousin of former Louisville and current professional basketball player Ray Spalding.
