= 2021–22 Washington Wizards season =

Season of National Basketball Association team the Washington Wizards

- Head coach: Wes Unseld Jr.
- General manager: Tommy Sheppard
- Owners: Ted Leonsis
- Arena: Capital One Arena

Results
- Record: 35–47 (.427)
- Place: Division: 4th (Southeast); Conference: 12th (Eastern)
- Playoff finish: Did not qualify
- Stats at Basketball Reference

Local media
- Television: NBC Sports Washington; NBC 4
- Radio: Federal News Radio; 106.7 The Fan

The 2021–22 Washington Wizards season was the 61st season of the franchise in the National Basketball Association (NBA) and 48th in the Washington, D.C. area. After a first-round exit from last year, Scott Brooks agreed to part ways with the Wizards on June 16, 2021. Wes Unseld Jr. would be hired as the next head coach on July 17, 2021.

The Wizards were eliminated from postseason contention on March 31 after an Atlanta Hawks win over the Cleveland Cavaliers.

== Draft picks ==
| Round | Pick | Player | Position | Nationality | College |
|---|---|---|---|---|---|
| 1 | 15 | Corey Kispert | SF | United States | Gonzaga |

Entering the draft, the Wizards only had pick #15 as their natural selection, which they used to draft Corey Kispert. However, before the draft, the Wizards pulled off a blockbuster trade that sent Russell Westbrook and two future second-round picks to the Los Angeles Lakers for multiple players and the rights to the Lakers' 2021 first-round pick (which became Isaiah Jackson) at #22. Later that night, the Wizards traded the draft rights to Jackson to the Indiana Pacers for Aaron Holiday and the rights to pick #31 (Isaiah Todd).

== Roster ==
2021–22 Washington Wizards roster
Players

| Pos. | No. | Player | Height | Weight | DOB | From |
|---|---|---|---|---|---|---|
| F | 9 | Deni Avdija | 6 ft 9 in (2.06 m) | 210 lb (95 kg) | 2001-01-03 | Israel |
| G | 3 | Bradley Beal (injured) | 6 ft 3 in (1.91 m) | 207 lb (94 kg) | 1993-06-28 | Florida |
| F/C | 13 | Thomas Bryant | 6 ft 10 in (2.08 m) | 248 lb (112 kg) | 1997-07-31 | Indiana |
| G | 1 | Kentavious Caldwell-Pope | 6 ft 5 in (1.96 m) | 204 lb (93 kg) | 1993-02-18 | Georgia |
| F/C | 22 | Vernon Carey | 6 ft 10 in (2.08 m) | 270 lb (122 kg) | 2001-02-25 | Duke |
| C | 21 | Daniel Gafford | 6 ft 11 in (2.11 m) | 235 lb (107 kg) | 1998-10-01 | Arkansas |
| F | 16 | Anthony Gill | 6 ft 7 in (2.01 m) | 230 lb (104 kg) | 1992-10-17 | Virginia |
| F | 8 | Rui Hachimura | 6 ft 8 in (2.03 m) | 230 lb (104 kg) | 1998-02-08 | Gonzaga |
| F | 24 | Corey Kispert | 6 ft 6 in (1.98 m) | 224 lb (102 kg) | 1999-03-03 | Gonzaga |
| F | 33 | Kyle Kuzma | 6 ft 9 in (2.06 m) | 221 lb (100 kg) | 1995-07-24 | Utah |
| G | 19 | Raul Neto | 6 ft 1 in (1.85 m) | 180 lb (82 kg) | 1992-05-19 | Brazil |
| F/C | 6 | Kristaps Porziņģis | 7 ft 3 in (2.21 m) | 240 lb (109 kg) | 1995-08-02 | Latvia |
| G | 31 | Tomáš Satoranský | 6 ft 7 in (2.01 m) | 210 lb (95 kg) | 1991-10-30 | Czech Republic |
| G | 20 | Jordan Schakel (TW) | 6 ft 6 in (1.98 m) | 200 lb (91 kg) | 1998-06-13 | San Diego State |
| G | 4 | Ish Smith | 6 ft 0 in (1.83 m) | 175 lb (79 kg) | 1988-07-05 | Wake Forest |
| F | 14 | Isaiah Todd | 6 ft 9 in (2.06 m) | 219 lb (99 kg) | 2001-10-17 | Word of God (NC) |
| G | 5 | Cassius Winston (TW) | 6 ft 1 in (1.85 m) | 185 lb (84 kg) | 1998-02-28 | Michigan State |

Coaches
Head coach
- Wes Unseld Jr.
Assistant(s)
- Joseph Blair
- Pat Delany
- Zach Guthrie
- Mike Miller
- Dean Oliver
- Ryan Richman

Legend
- (DP) Unsigned draft pick
- (FA) Free agent
- (S) Suspended
- (GL) On assignment to G League
- (TW) Two-way affiliate player
- Injured

Roster
Updated: April 8, 2022

== Standings ==
=== Division ===
| Southeast Division | W | L | PCT | GB | Home | Road | Div | GP |
|---|---|---|---|---|---|---|---|---|
| c – Miami Heat | 53 | 29 | .646 | – | 29‍–‍12 | 24‍–‍17 | 13–3 | 82 |
| x − Atlanta Hawks | 43 | 39 | .524 | 10.0 | 27‍–‍14 | 16‍–‍25 | 9–7 | 82 |
| pi − Charlotte Hornets | 43 | 39 | .524 | 10.0 | 22‍–‍19 | 21‍–‍20 | 8–8 | 82 |
| Washington Wizards | 35 | 47 | .427 | 18.0 | 21‍–‍20 | 14‍–‍27 | 7–9 | 82 |
| Orlando Magic | 22 | 60 | .268 | 31.0 | 12‍–‍29 | 10‍–‍31 | 3–13 | 82 |

=== Conference ===
Eastern Conference
| # | Team | W | L | PCT | GB | GP |
|---|---|---|---|---|---|---|
| 1 | c – Miami Heat * | 53 | 29 | .646 | – | 82 |
| 2 | y – Boston Celtics * | 51 | 31 | .622 | 2.0 | 82 |
| 3 | y – Milwaukee Bucks * | 51 | 31 | .622 | 2.0 | 82 |
| 4 | x – Philadelphia 76ers | 51 | 31 | .622 | 2.0 | 82 |
| 5 | x – Toronto Raptors | 48 | 34 | .585 | 5.0 | 82 |
| 6 | x – Chicago Bulls | 46 | 36 | .561 | 7.0 | 82 |
| 7 | x − Brooklyn Nets | 44 | 38 | .537 | 9.0 | 82 |
| 8 | pi − Cleveland Cavaliers | 44 | 38 | .537 | 9.0 | 82 |
| 9 | x − Atlanta Hawks | 43 | 39 | .524 | 10.0 | 82 |
| 10 | pi − Charlotte Hornets | 43 | 39 | .524 | 10.0 | 82 |
| 11 | New York Knicks | 37 | 45 | .451 | 16.0 | 82 |
| 12 | Washington Wizards | 35 | 47 | .427 | 18.0 | 82 |
| 13 | Indiana Pacers | 25 | 57 | .305 | 28.0 | 82 |
| 14 | Detroit Pistons | 23 | 59 | .280 | 30.0 | 82 |
| 15 | Orlando Magic | 22 | 60 | .268 | 31.0 | 82 |

== Game log ==
=== Preseason ===
2021 preseason game log
Total: 0–4 (Home: 0–2; Road: 0–2)
Preseason: 0–4 (home: 0–2; road: 0–2)

| Game | Date | Team | Score | High points | High rebounds | High assists | Location Attendance | Record |
|---|---|---|---|---|---|---|---|---|
| 1 | October 5 | @ Houston | L 119–125 | Bradley Beal (18) | Montrezl Harrell (11) | Spencer Dinwiddie (5) | Toyota Center; 11,495 | 0–1 |
| 2 | October 9 | New York | L 99–117 | Montrezl Harrell (18) | Montrezl Harrell (10) | Beal, Dinwiddie (4) | Capital One Arena; 8,060 | 0–2 |
| 3 | October 12 | Toronto | L 108–113 | Kyle Kuzma (24) | Daniel Gafford (17) | Spencer Dinwiddie (7) | Capital One Arena; 7,048 | 0–3 |
| 4 | October 15 | @ New York | L 113–115 | Spencer Dinwiddie (17) | Daniel Gafford (10) | Kyle Kuzma (5) | Madison Square Garden; 12,258 | 0–4 |

2021–22 season schedule

=== Regular season ===
2021–22 game log
Total: 35–47 (Home: 21–21; Road: 14–26)
October: 5–1 (home: 3–0; road: 2–1)

| Game | Date | Team | Score | High points | High rebounds | High assists | Location Attendance | Record |
|---|---|---|---|---|---|---|---|---|
| 1 | October 20 | @ Toronto | W 98–83 | Bradley Beal (23) | Kyle Kuzma (15) | Spencer Dinwiddie (6) | Scotiabank Arena; 19,800 | 1–0 |
| 2 | October 22 | Indiana | W 135–134 (OT) | Spencer Dinwiddie (34) | Kyle Kuzma (11) | Spencer Dinwiddie (9) | Capital One Arena; 15,407 | 2–0 |
| 3 | October 25 | @ Brooklyn | L 90–104 | Bradley Beal (19) | Kyle Kuzma (13) | Spencer Dinwiddle (6) | Barclays Center; 14,487 | 2–1 |
| 4 | October 27 | @ Boston | W 116–107 | Montrezl Harrell (25) | Montrezl Harrell (11) | Dinwiddie, Holiday (3) | TD Garden; 19,156 | 3–1 |
| 5 | October 28 | Atlanta | W 122–111 | Bradley Beal (27) | Montrezl Harrell (13) | Harrell, Neto (5) | Capital One Arena; 13,653 | 4–1 |
| 6 | October 30 | Boston | W 115–112 (2OT) | Bradley Beal (36) | Kyle Kuzma (17) | Bradley Beal (6) | Capital One Arena; 15,813 | 5–1 |

November: 8–7 (home: 4–2; road: 4–5)

| Game | Date | Team | Score | High points | High rebounds | High assists | Location Attendance | Record |
|---|---|---|---|---|---|---|---|---|
| 7 | November 1 | @ Atlanta | L 111–118 | Bradley Beal (24) | Kyle Kuzma (6) | Spencer Dinwiddie (10) | State Farm Arena; 14,632 | 5–2 |
| 8 | November 3 | Toronto | L 100–109 | Bradley Beal (25) | Montrezl Harrell (10) | Bradley Beal (7) | Capital One Arena; 13,538 | 5–3 |
| 9 | November 5 | Memphis | W 115–87 | Bradley Beal (17) | Montrezl Harrell (8) | Bradley Beal (7) | Capital One Arena; 16,302 | 6–3 |
| 10 | November 7 | Milwaukee | W 101–94 | Bradley Beal (30) | Kyle Kuzma (10) | Bradley Beal (8) | Capital One Arena; 15,570 | 7–3 |
| 11 | November 10 | @ Cleveland | W 97–94 | Montrezl Harrell (24) | Montrezl Harrell (11) | Bradley Beal (7) | Rocket Mortgage FieldHouse; 18,056 | 8–3 |
| 12 | November 13 | @ Orlando | W 104–92 | Spencer Dinwiddie (23) | Spencer Dinwiddie (11) | Spencer Dinwiddie (6) | Amway Center; 17,272 | 9–3 |
| 13 | November 15 | New Orleans | W 105–100 | Spencer Dinwiddie (27) | Deni Avdija (10) | Spencer Dinwiddie (9) | Capital One Arena; 13,914 | 10–3 |
| 14 | November 17 | @ Charlotte | L 87–97 | Bradley Beal (24) | Deni Avdija (11) | Bradley Beal (7) | Spectrum Center; 14,402 | 10–4 |
| 15 | November 18 | @ Miami | L 97–112 | Bradley Beal (30) | Kyle Kuzma (13) | Kyle Kuzma (7) | FTX Arena; 19,600 | 10–5 |
| 16 | November 20 | Miami | W 103–100 | Bradley Beal (21) | Kyle Kuzma (11) | Bradley Beal (9) | Capital One Arena; 20,476 | 11–5 |
| 17 | November 22 | Charlotte | L 103–109 | Montrezl Harrell (24) | Montrezl Harrell (18) | Bradley Beal (9) | Capital One Arena; 16,575 | 11–6 |
| 18 | November 24 | @ New Orleans | L 102–127 | Bradley Beal (23) | Montrezl Harrell (9) | Spencer Dinwiddie (9) | Smoothie King Center; 14,659 | 11–7 |
| 19 | November 26 | @ Oklahoma City | W 101–99 | Beal, Caldwell-Pope (20) | Kyle Kuzma (10) | Bradley Beal (6) | Paycom Center; 14,579 | 12–7 |
| 20 | November 27 | @ Dallas | W 120–114 | Bradley Beal (26) | Daniel Gafford (10) | Bradley Beal (7) | American Airlines Center; 20,223 | 13–7 |
| 21 | November 29 | @ San Antonio | L 99–116 | Bradley Beal (18) | Daniel Gafford (10) | Bradley Beal (8) | AT&T Center; 12,606 | 13–8 |

December: 5–9 (home: 2–3; road: 3–6)

| Game | Date | Team | Score | High points | High rebounds | High assists | Location Attendance | Record |
|---|---|---|---|---|---|---|---|---|
| 22 | December 1 | Minnesota | W 115–107 | Montrezl Harrell (27) | Daniel Gafford (10) | Spencer Dinwiddie (11) | Capital One Arena; 15,318 | 14–8 |
| 23 | December 3 | Cleveland | L 101–116 | Deni Avdija (16) | Montrezl Harrell (8) | Dinwiddie, Holiday, Neto (4) | Capital One Arena; 17,227 | 14–9 |
| 24 | December 5 | @ Toronto | L 90–102 | Kentavious Caldwell-Pope (26) | Montrezl Harrell (14) | Bradley Beal (7) | Scotiabank Arena; 19,800 | 14–10 |
| 25 | December 6 | @ Indiana | L 110–116 | Bradley Beal (34) | Daniel Gafford (8) | Holiday, Neto (5) | Gainbridge Fieldhouse; 12,581 | 14–11 |
| 26 | December 8 | @ Detroit | W 119–116 (OT) | Kyle Kuzma (26) | Daniel Gafford (10) | Spencer Dinwiddie (7) | Little Caesars Arena; 10,499 | 15–11 |
| 27 | December 11 | Utah | L 98–123 | Bradley Beal (21) | Daniel Gafford (11) | Bradley Beal (5) | Capital One Arena; 17,575 | 15–12 |
| 28 | December 13 | @ Denver | L 107–113 | Davis Bertans (21) | Montrezl Harrell (7) | Bradley Beal (10) | Ball Arena; 14,632 | 15–13 |
| 29 | December 15 | @ Sacramento | L 105–119 | Bradley Beal (30) | Kentavious Caldwell-Pope (7) | Bradley Beal (5) | Golden 1 Center; 13,806 | 15–14 |
| 30 | December 16 | @ Phoenix | L 98–118 | Bradley Beal (26) | Montrezl Harrell (7) | Bradley Beal (5) | Footprint Center; 16,177 | 15–15 |
| 31 | December 18 | @ Utah | W 109–103 | Bradley Beal (37) | Daniel Gafford (9) | Bradley Beal (7) | Vivint Arena; 18,306 | 16–15 |
| - | December 21 | @ Brooklyn | Postponed (COVID-19) (Makeup date: February 17) | | | | | |
| 32 | December 23 | @ New York | W 124–117 | Spencer Dinwiddie (21) | Kyle Kuzma (10) | Spencer Dinwiddie (12) | Madison Square Garden; 18,208 | 17–15 |
| 33 | December 26 | Philadelphia | L 96–117 | Spencer Dinwiddie (17) | Kyle Kuzma (10) | Spencer Dinwiddie (6) | Capital One Arena; 16,767 | 17–16 |
| 34 | December 28 | @ Miami | L 112–119 | Spencer Dinwiddie (24) | Daniel Gafford (11) | Spencer Dinwiddie (11) | FTX Arena; 19,600 | 17–17 |
| 35 | December 30 | Cleveland | W 110–93 | Bradley Beal (29) | Kyle Kuzma (10) | Bradley Beal (10) | Capital One Arena; 15,637 | 18–17 |

January: 5–9 (home: 4–7; road: 1–2)

| Game | Date | Team | Score | High points | High rebounds | High assists | Location Attendance | Record |
|---|---|---|---|---|---|---|---|---|
| 36 | January 1 | Chicago | L 119–120 | Kyle Kuzma (29) | Kyle Kuzma (12) | Bradley Beal (17) | Capital One Arena; 19,043 | 18–18 |
| 37 | January 3 | Charlotte | W 124–121 | Kyle Kuzma (36) | Kyle Kuzma (14) | Avdija, Beal (8) | Capital One Arena; 8,902 | 19–18 |
| 38 | January 5 | Houston | L 111–114 | Bradley Beal (27) | Kyle Kuzma (9) | Bradley Beal (5) | Capital One Arena; 13,014 | 19–19 |
| 39 | January 7 | @ Chicago | L 122–130 | Bradley Beal (26) | Kyle Kuzma (11) | Bradley Beal (6) | United Center; 21,700 | 19–20 |
| 40 | January 9 | @ Orlando | W 102–100 | Kyle Kuzma (27) | Kyle Kuzma (22) | Spencer Dinwiddie (10) | Amway Center; 13,223 | 20–20 |
| 41 | January 11 | Oklahoma City | W 122–118 | Kyle Kuzma (29) | Gafford, Harrell (7) | Spencer Dinwiddie (10) | Capital One Arena; 13,985 | 21–20 |
| 42 | January 12 | Orlando | W 112–106 | Kyle Kuzma (19) | Caldwell-Pope, Kuzma (10) | Kyle Kuzma (9) | Capital One Arena; 13,138 | 22–20 |
| 43 | January 15 | Portland | L 110–115 | Spencer Dinwiddie (27) | Kyle Kuzma (12) | Spencer Dinwiddie (7) | Capital One Arena; 15,124 | 22–21 |
| 44 | January 17 | Philadelphia | W 117–98 | Montrezl Harrell (18) | Kyle Kuzma (16) | Spencer Dinwiddie (7) | Capital One Arena; 14,581 | 23–21 |
| 45 | January 19 | Brooklyn | L 118–119 | Bradley Beal (23) | Harrell, Kuzma (6) | Bradley Beal (9) | Capital One Arena; 15,380 | 23–22 |
| 46 | January 21 | Toronto | L 105–109 | Bradley Beal (25) | Rui Hachimura (8) | Bradley Beal (8) | Capital One Arena; 14,755 | 23–23 |
| 47 | January 23 | Boston | L 87–116 | Bradley Beal (19) | Avdija, Beal, Hachimura (7) | Bradley Beal (7) | Capital One Arena; 16,371 | 23–24 |
| 48 | January 25 | L.A. Clippers | L 115–116 | Bradley Beal (23) | Kyle Kuzma (12) | Bradley Beal (6) | Capital One Arena; 13,544 | 23–25 |
| 49 | January 29 | @ Memphis | L 95–115 | Kyle Kuzma (30) | Kyle Kuzma (8) | Bradley Beal (12) | FedEx Forum; 17,135 | 23–26 |

February: 4–6 (home: 2–3; road: 2–3)

| Game | Date | Team | Score | High points | High rebounds | High assists | Location Attendance | Record |
|---|---|---|---|---|---|---|---|---|
| 50 | February 1 | @ Milwaukee | L 98–112 | Kyle Kuzma (25) | Kyle Kuzma (11) | Spencer Dinwiddie (9) | Fiserv Forum; 17,341 | 23–27 |
| 51 | February 2 | @ Philadelphia | W 106–103 | Kyle Kuzma (24) | Spencer Dinwiddie (12) | Spencer Dinwiddie (10) | Wells Fargo Center; 20,089 | 24–27 |
| 52 | February 5 | Phoenix | L 80–95 | Montrezl Harrell (15) | Montrezl Harrell (7) | Dinwiddie, Holiday (3) | Capital One Arena; 18,058 | 24–28 |
| 53 | February 7 | Miami | L 100–121 | Corey Kispert (20) | Avdija, Kispert (6) | Spencer Dinwiddie (6) | Capital One Arena; 14,222 | 24–29 |
| 54 | February 10 | Brooklyn | W 113–112 | Raul Neto (21) | Kyle Kuzma (13) | Kyle Kuzma (10) | Capital One Arena; 14,222 | 25–29 |
| 55 | February 12 | Sacramento | L 110–123 | Kyle Kuzma (22) | Kyle Kuzma (8) | Kyle Kuzma (7) | Capital One Arena; 14,169 | 25–30 |
| 56 | February 14 | Detroit | W 103–94 | Kyle Kuzma (23) | Ish Smith (6) | Deni Avdija (15) | Capital One Arena; 10,793 | 26–30 |
| 57 | February 16 | @ Indiana | L 108–113 | Kentavious Caldwell-Pope (27) | Kyle Kuzma (15) | Raul Neto (8) | Gainbridge Fieldhouse; 14,540 | 26–31 |
| 58 | February 17 | @ Brooklyn | W 117–103 | Rui Hachimura (20) | Deni Avdija (8) | Ish Smith (6) | Barclays Center; 17,447 | 27–31 |
| 59 | February 25 | San Antonio | L 153–157 (2OT) | Kyle Kuzma (36) | Deni Avdija (9) | Raul Neto (9) | Capital One Arena; 15,302 | 27–32 |
| 60 | February 26 | @ Cleveland | L 86–92 | Kyle Kuzma (34) | Kyle Kuzma (13) | Raul Neto (6) | Rocket Mortgage FieldHouse; 19,432 | 27–33 |

March: 6–10 (home: 5–4; road: 1–6)

| Game | Date | Team | Score | High points | High rebounds | High assists | Location Attendance | Record |
|---|---|---|---|---|---|---|---|---|
| 61 | March 1 | Detroit | W 116–113 | Kyle Kuzma (21) | Kyle Kuzma (9) | Ish Smith (8) | Capital One Arena; 12,122 | 28–33 |
| 62 | March 4 | Atlanta | L 114–117 | Kentavious Caldwell-Pope (28) | Hachimura, Bryant (6) | Kyle Kuzma (11) | Capital One Arena; 15,927 | 28–34 |
| 63 | March 6 | Indiana | W 133–123 | Kristaps Porziņģis (25) | Ish Smith (7) | Ish Smith (9) | Capital One Arena; 13,937 | 29–34 |
| 64 | March 9 | @ L.A. Clippers | L 109–115 | Kristaps Porziņģis (19) | Daniel Gafford (10) | Ish Smith (8) | Crypto.com Arena; 15,282 | 29–35 |
| 65 | March 11 | @ L.A. Lakers | L 109–122 | Kyle Kuzma (23) | Kristaps Porziņģis (14) | Neto, Satoranský (4) | Crypto.com Arena; 18,997 | 29–36 |
| 66 | March 12 | @ Portland | L 118–127 | Kentavious Caldwell-Pope (26) | Corey Kispert (5) | Caldwell-Pope, Neto, Smith (5) | Moda Center; 17,524 | 29–37 |
| 67 | March 14 | @ Golden State | L 112–126 | Kristaps Porziņģis (25) | Kristaps Porziņģis (8) | Raul Neto (7) | Chase Center; 18,064 | 29–38 |
| 68 | March 16 | Denver | L 109–127 | Deni Avdija (19) | Kyle Kuzma (9) | Kyle Kuzma (7) | Capital One Arena; 15,326 | 29–39 |
| 69 | March 18 | @ New York | L 97–100 | Kuzma, Porziņģis (18) | Kristaps Porziņģis (11) | Kyle Kuzma (9) | Madison Square Garden; 19,812 | 29–40 |
| 70 | March 19 | L.A. Lakers | W 127–119 | Kristaps Porziņģis (27) | Caldwell-Pope (10) | Tomáš Satoranský (6) | Capital One Arena; 20,476 | 30–40 |
| 71 | March 21 | @ Houston | L 97–115 | Kristaps Porziņģis (22) | Kristaps Porziņģis (13) | Raul Neto (10) | Toyota Center; 13,396 | 30–41 |
| 72 | March 24 | @ Milwaukee | L 102–114 | Ish Smith (17) | Kristaps Porziņģis (9) | Neto, Smith (6) | Fiserv Forum; 18,018 | 30–42 |
| 73 | March 25 | @ Detroit | W 100–97 | Kristaps Porziņģis (30) | Deni Avdija (10) | Tomáš Satoranský (6) | Little Caesars Arena; 18,943 | 31–42 |
| 74 | March 27 | Golden State | W 123–115 | Corey Kispert (25) | Kristaps Porziņģis (9) | Tomáš Satoranský (7) | Capital One Arena; 24,760 | 32–42 |
| 75 | March 29 | Chicago | L 94–107 | Rui Hachimura (21) | Kristaps Porziņģis (10) | Tomáš Satoranský (10) | Capital One Arena; 15,922 | 32–43 |
| 76 | March 30 | Orlando | W 127–110 | Kristaps Porziņģis (35) | Tomáš Satoranský (10) | Tomáš Satoranský (13) | Capital One Arena; 16,455 | 33–43 |

April: 2–4 (home: 1–1; road: 1–3)

| Game | Date | Team | Score | High points | High rebounds | High assists | Location Attendance | Record |
|---|---|---|---|---|---|---|---|---|
| 77 | April 1 | Dallas | W 135–103 | Kentavious Caldwell-Pope (35) | Kristaps Porziņģis (9) | Ish Smith (9) | Capital One Arena; 17.745 | 34–43 |
| 78 | April 3 | @ Boston | L 102–144 | Caldwell-Pope, Porziņģis (17) | Hachimura, Porziņģis (7) | Tomáš Satoranský (7) | TD Garden; 19,156 | 34–44 |
| 79 | April 5 | @ Minnesota | W 132–114 | Kristaps Porziņģis (25) | Daniel Gafford (12) | Ish Smith (14) | Target Center; 17,136 | 35–44 |
| 80 | April 6 | @ Atlanta | L 103–118 | Kristaps Porziņģis (26) | Kristaps Porziņģis (18) | Avdija, Smith (6) | State Farm Arena; 17,381 | 35–45 |
| 81 | April 8 | New York | L 92–114 | Rui Hachimura (21) | Thomas Bryant (10) | Tomáš Satoranský (8) | Capital One Arena; 19,472 | 35–46 |
| 82 | April 10 | @ Charlotte | L 108–124 | Rui Hachimura (21) | Anthony Gill (8) | Tomáš Satoranský (9) | Spectrum Center; 18,465 | 35–47 |

2021–22 season schedule

== Player statistics ==
Legend
| GP | Games played | GS | Games started | MPG | Minutes per game |
| FG% | Field-goal percentage | 3P% | 3-point field-goal percentage | FT% | Free-throw percentage |
| RPG | Rebounds per game | APG | Assists per game | SPG | Steals per game |
| BPG | Blocks per game | PPG | Points per game |

=== Regular season ===
Washington Wizards statistics
| Player | GP | GS | MPG | FG% | 3P% | FT% | RPG | APG | SPG | BPG | PPG |
|---|---|---|---|---|---|---|---|---|---|---|---|
| Deni Avdija | 82 | 8 | 24.2 | .432 | .317 | .757 | 5.2 | 2.0 | .7 | .5 | 8.4 |
| Kentavious Caldwell-Pope | 77 | 77 | 30.2 | .435 | .390 | .890 | 3.4 | 1.9 | 1.1 | .3 | 13.2 |
| Corey Kispert | 77 | 36 | 23.4 | .455 | .350 | .871 | 2.7 | 1.1 | .5 | .3 | 8.2 |
| Daniel Gafford | 72 | 53 | 20.1 | .693 | .000 | .699 | 5.7 | .9 | .4 | 1.4 | 9.4 |
| Raul Neto | 70 | 19 | 19.6 | .463 | .292 | .769 | 1.9 | 3.1 | .8 | .0 | 7.5 |
| Kyle Kuzma | 66 | 66 | 33.4 | .452 | .341 | .712 | 8.5 | 3.5 | .6 | .9 | 17.1 |
| Montrezl Harrell^{†} | 46 | 3 | 24.3 | .645 | .267 | .727 | 6.7 | 2.1 | .4 | .7 | 14.1 |
| Spencer Dinwiddie^{†} | 44 | 44 | 30.2 | .376 | .310 | .811 | 4.7 | 5.8 | .6 | .2 | 12.6 |
| Anthony Gill | 44 | 0 | 10.5 | .569 | .538 | .808 | 1.9 | .6 | .1 | .3 | 4.1 |
| Rui Hachimura | 42 | 13 | 22.5 | .491 | .447 | .697 | 3.8 | 1.1 | .5 | .2 | 11.3 |
| Aaron Holiday^{†} | 41 | 14 | 16.2 | .467 | .343 | .800 | 1.6 | 1.9 | .6 | .2 | 6.1 |
| Bradley Beal | 40 | 40 | 36.0 | .451 | .300 | .833 | 4.7 | 6.6 | .9 | .4 | 23.2 |
| Dāvis Bertāns^{†} | 34 | 0 | 14.7 | .351 | .319 | .933 | 1.8 | .5 | .3 | .2 | 5.7 |
| Ish Smith^{†} | 28 | 0 | 22.0 | .457 | .357 | .600 | 3.0 | 5.2 | 1.0 | .5 | 8.6 |
| Thomas Bryant | 27 | 9 | 16.3 | .520 | .286 | .875 | 4.0 | .9 | .2 | .8 | 7.4 |
| Tomáš Satoranský^{†} | 22 | 10 | 18.9 | .476 | .273 | .840 | 2.8 | 4.9 | .7 | .2 | 4.9 |
| Kristaps Porziņģis^{†} | 17 | 17 | 28.2 | .475 | .367 | .871 | 8.8 | 2.9 | .7 | 1.5 | 22.1 |
| Isaiah Todd | 12 | 0 | 6.2 | .269 | .250 | .333 | 1.0 | .3 | .3 | .2 | 1.7 |
| Cassius Winston | 7 | 0 | 5.6 | .364 | .333 | 1.000 | .1 | 1.0 | .0 | .0 | 2.0 |
| Joël Ayayi | 7 | 0 | 2.9 | .167 | .000 | | .4 | .6 | .0 | .0 | .3 |
| Jordan Schakel | 4 | 0 | 7.5 | .091 | .167 | 1.000 | 2.0 | .0 | .3 | .0 | 1.3 |
| Vernon Carey Jr.^{†} | 3 | 0 | 9.0 | .571 | | .400 | 2.3 | .0 | .3 | .3 | 4.0 |
| Craig Sword | 3 | 0 | 6.3 | .750 | .000 | | .0 | .3 | 1.3 | .0 | 2.0 |
| Alize Johnson^{†} | 3 | 0 | 6.0 | .333 | .000 | .000 | 4.0 | .0 | .0 | .0 | 1.3 |
| Greg Monroe^{†} | 2 | 0 | 9.0 | .500 | | | 5.0 | .5 | .5 | .5 | 4.0 |
| Jordan Goodwin | 2 | 0 | 3.0 | .000 | .000 | | .5 | .0 | .0 | .0 | .0 |
| Brad Wanamaker^{†} | 1 | 1 | 27.0 | .400 | | 1.000 | 4.0 | 7.0 | 2.0 | .0 | 7.0 |
| Tremont Waters^{†} | 1 | 0 | 8.0 | .500 | | | .0 | .0 | 1.0 | .0 | 2.0 |
| Jaime Echenique | 1 | 0 | 3.0 | | | | .0 | .0 | .0 | .0 | .0 |

- ^{†} Denotes player spent time with another team in the season. Stats reflect time with the Wizards only.

== Transactions ==
=== Trades ===
Five-team trade

August 6, 2021
To Brooklyn Nets

- 2024 second-round pick (from Washington)
- 2025 second-round pick swap rights (from Washington)
- Draft rights to Nikola Milutinov (2015 No. 26) (from San Antonio)
To Indiana Pacers

- Draft rights to Isaiah Jackson (No. 22) (from Los Angeles)
To Los Angeles Lakers

- Russell Westbrook (from Washington)
- 2023 CHI second-round pick (from Washington)
- 2024 second-round pick (from Washington)
- 2028 WAS second-round pick (from Washington)
To San Antonio Spurs

- Chandler Hutchison (from Washington)
- 2022 second-round pick (from Washington)
To Washington Wizards

- Kentavious Caldwell-Pope (from Los Angeles)
- Spencer Dinwiddie (sign-and-trade) (from Brooklyn)
- Montrezl Harrell (from Los Angeles)
- Aaron Holiday (from Indiana)
- Kyle Kuzma (from Los Angeles)
- Draft rights to Isaiah Todd (No. 31) (from Indiana)
- Cash considerations (from Indiana)
February 10, 2022
To Washington Wizards

- Vernon Carey Jr.
- Ish Smith
- 2023 BOS protected second-round pick (Note: Washington will receive the pick if it is No. 46–60; if the pick is not conveyed in 2023, Washington will receive Boston's 2024 second-round pick.)
To Charlotte Hornets

- Montrezl Harrell

To Washington Wizards

- Kristaps Porziņģis
- 2022 protected second-round pick
To Dallas Mavericks

- Dāvis Bertāns
- Spencer Dinwiddie

To Washington Wizards

- Cash considerations
- Trade exception
To Phoenix Suns

- Aaron Holiday

=== Free agents ===
==== Re-signed ====
| Player | Date Signed | Contract | Ref. |
|---|---|---|---|
| Raul Neto | August 6, 2021 | 1 yr, $2M | |
| Cassius Winston | August 22, 2021 | Two-way contract | |

==== Additions ====
| Player | Date Signed | Contract | Former Team | Ref. |
|---|---|---|---|---|
| Joel Ayayi | October 18, 2021 | Two-way contract | Los Angeles Lakers | |
| Tomáš Satoranský | February 28, 2022 | | San Antonio Spurs | |

==== Subtractions ====
| Player | Reason Left | Date Left | New Team | Ref. |
|---|---|---|---|---|
| Robin Lopez | UFA | August 3, 2021 | Orlando Magic | |
| Ish Smith | UFA | August 5, 2021 | Charlotte Hornets | |
| Caleb Homesley | Waived | August 5, 2021 | (Germany) Hamburg Towers | |
| Isaac Bonga | | August 11, 2021 | Toronto Raptors | |
| Garrison Mathews | | September 27, 2021 | Boston Celtics | |
