= 2021–22 Charlotte Hornets season =

North American basketball season

- Head coach: James Borrego
- General manager: Mitch Kupchak
- Owners: Michael Jordan
- Arena: Spectrum Center

Results
- Record: 43–39 (.524)
- Place: Division: 3rd (Southeast); Conference: 10th (Eastern)
- Playoff finish: Did not qualify
- Stats at Basketball Reference

Local media
- Television: Bally Sports South, Bally Sports Southeast
- Radio: WFNZ

The 2021–22 Charlotte Hornets season was the 32nd season of the franchise in the National Basketball Association (NBA).

Despite clinching a spot in the postseason via the play-in tournament for the second consecutive season, and their first winning season since 2016, the Hornets lost 132–103 to the Atlanta Hawks, and have not played in the playoffs since 2016.

After failing to make the playoffs in his four seasons as head coach, James Borrego was fired at the end of the season. He posted a 138–163 (.458) record during his tenure with the Hornets.

With the Memphis Grizzlies winning the Southwest Division title for the first time in Grizzlies' franchise history, Charlotte is now the only NBA franchise to have never won a division title, having gone 32 seasons without winning a division title since the franchise began play in the 1988–89 season.

== NBA draft ==
Round	Pick	Player	Position	Nationality	School/club team
1	11	James Bouknight	SG	United States	UConn
2	56	Scottie Lewis	SG	United States	Florida
2	57	Balša Koprivica	C	Serbia	Florida State

The Hornets entered the draft with one original first-round selection and two acquired second-round selections, which they got from the Los Angeles Clippers and the Brooklyn Nets, respectively. They had traded their original second-round selection to the New York Knicks, who later traded it to the Detroit Pistons.

== Roster ==
2021–22 Charlotte Hornets roster
Players

Pos.	No.	Player	Height	Weight	DOB	From
G	2	LaMelo Ball	6 ft 7 in (2.01 m)	180 lb (82 kg)	2001-08-22	SPIRE Academy (OH)
G	5	James Bouknight	6 ft 4 in (1.93 m)	190 lb (86 kg)	2000-09-18	Connecticut
F	0	Miles Bridges	6 ft 7 in (2.01 m)	225 lb (102 kg)	1998-03-21	Michigan State
F/C	8	Montrezl Harrell	6 ft 7 in (2.01 m)	240 lb (109 kg)	1994-01-26	Louisville
SF	20	Gordon Hayward	6 ft 7 in (2.01 m)	225 lb (102 kg)	1990-03-23	Butler
F/C	23	Kai Jones	6 ft 11 in (2.11 m)	221 lb (100 kg)	2001-01-19	Texas
F	98	Arnoldas Kulboka (TW)	6 ft 10 in (2.08 m)	209 lb (95 kg)	1998-01-04	Lithuania
G	16	Scottie Lewis (TW)	6 ft 5 in (1.96 m)	185 lb (84 kg)	2000-03-12	Florida
F	11	Cody Martin	6 ft 6 in (1.98 m)	205 lb (93 kg)	1995-09-28	Nevada
F	6	Jalen McDaniels	6 ft 9 in (2.06 m)	205 lb (93 kg)	1998-01-31	San Diego State
G/F	12	Kelly Oubre	6 ft 6 in (1.98 m)	203 lb (92 kg)	1995-12-09	Kansas
C	24	Mason Plumlee	7 ft 0 in (2.13 m)	254 lb (115 kg)	1990-03-05	Duke
C	14	Nick Richards	7 ft 0 in (2.13 m)	245 lb (111 kg)	1997-11-29	Kentucky
G	3	Terry Rozier	6 ft 1 in (1.85 m)	190 lb (86 kg)	1994-03-17	Louisville
G	4	Isaiah Thomas	5 ft 9 in (1.75 m)	185 lb (84 kg)	1989-02-07	Washington
F	21	JT Thor	6 ft 9 in (2.06 m)	203 lb (92 kg)	2002-08-26	Auburn
F	25	P. J. Washington	6 ft 7 in (2.01 m)	230 lb (104 kg)	1998-08-23	Kentucky

Coaches
Head coach
- James Borrego
Assistant(s)
- Nick Friedman
- Dutch Gaitley
- Marlon Garnett
- Jay Hernandez
- Chad Iske
- Nate Mitchell
- Jay Triano

Legend
- (DP) Unsigned draft pick
- (FA) Free agent
- (S) Suspended
- (GL) On assignment to G League affiliate
- (TW) Two-way affiliate player
- Injured

Roster
Updated: April 2, 2022

== Standings ==
=== Division ===
Southeast Division	W	L	PCT	GB	Home	Road	Div	GP
c – Miami Heat	53	29	.646	–	29‍–‍12	24‍–‍17	13–3	82
x − Atlanta Hawks	43	39	.524	10.0	27‍–‍14	16‍–‍25	9–7	82
pi − Charlotte Hornets	43	39	.524	10.0	22‍–‍19	21‍–‍20	8–8	82
Washington Wizards	35	47	.427	18.0	21‍–‍20	14‍–‍27	7–9	82
Orlando Magic	22	60	.268	31.0	12‍–‍29	10‍–‍31	3–13	82

=== Conference ===
Eastern Conference
#	Team	W	L	PCT	GB	GP
1	c – Miami Heat *	53	29	.646	–	82
2	y – Boston Celtics *	51	31	.622	2.0	82
3	y – Milwaukee Bucks *	51	31	.622	2.0	82
4	x – Philadelphia 76ers	51	31	.622	2.0	82
5	x – Toronto Raptors	48	34	.585	5.0	82
6	x – Chicago Bulls	46	36	.561	7.0	82
7	x − Brooklyn Nets	44	38	.537	9.0	82
8	pi − Cleveland Cavaliers	44	38	.537	9.0	82
9	x − Atlanta Hawks	43	39	.524	10.0	82
10	pi − Charlotte Hornets	43	39	.524	10.0	82
11	New York Knicks	37	45	.451	16.0	82
12	Washington Wizards	35	47	.427	18.0	82
13	Indiana Pacers	25	57	.305	28.0	82
14	Detroit Pistons	23	59	.280	30.0	82
15	Orlando Magic	22	60	.268	31.0	82

== Game log ==
=== Preseason ===
2021 preseason game log
Total: 1–3 (Home: 0–2; Road: 1–1)
Preseason: 1–3 (home: 0–2; road: 1–1)

Game	Date	Team	Score	High points	High rebounds	High assists	Location Attendance	Record
1	October 4	@ Oklahoma City	W 113–97	James Bouknight (20)	McDaniels, Plumlee (7)	LaMelo Ball (5)	Paycom Center; N/A (Note: Spectators were in attendance, but the exact number was not reported.)	1–0
2	October 7	Memphis	L 98–128	Terry Rozier (21)	Martin, Washington (5)	LaMelo Ball (7)	Spectrum Center; 8,916	1–1
3	October 11	@ Miami	L 103–104	Miles Bridges (22)	Miles Bridges (10)	LaMelo Ball (9)	FTX Arena; 19,600	1–2
4	October 13	Dallas	L 59–127	James Bouknight (12)	Nick Richards (9)	Cody Martin (2)	Spectrum Center; 8,583	1–3

2021–22 season schedule

=== Regular season ===
2021–22 game log
Total: 43–39 (Home: 22–19; Road: 21–20)
October: 5–2 (home: 2–1; road: 3–1)

Game	Date	Team	Score	High points	High rebounds	High assists	Location Attendance	Record
1	October 20	Indiana	W 123–122	LaMelo Ball (31)	Mason Plumlee (10)	LaMelo Ball (7)	Spectrum Center; 15,521	1–0
2	October 22	@ Cleveland	W 123–112	Miles Bridges (30)	Mason Plumlee (14)	Ish Smith (8)	Rocket Mortgage FieldHouse; 17,116	2–0
3	October 24	@ Brooklyn	W 111–95	Miles Bridges (32)	Bridges, Oubre Jr. (9)	Gordon Hayward (6)	Barclays Center; 17,732	3–0
4	October 25	Boston	L 129–140	Ball, Bridges (25)	Mason Plumlee (11)	LaMelo Ball (9)	Spectrum Center; 17,238	3–1
5	October 27	@ Orlando	W 120–111	Miles Bridges (31)	Mason Plumlee (10)	Hayward, Martin (5)	Amway Center; 14,082	4–1
6	October 29	@ Miami	L 99–114	Gordon Hayward (23)	Miles Bridges (8)	LaMelo Ball (6)	FTX Arena; 19,600	4–2
7	October 31	Portland	W 125–113	LaMelo Ball (27)	LaMelo Ball (9)	Miles Bridges (9)	Spectrum Center; 14,960	5–2

November: 8–8 (home: 5–1; road: 3–7)

Game	Date	Team	Score	High points	High rebounds	High assists	Location Attendance	Record
8	November 1	Cleveland	L 110–113	LaMelo Ball (30)	Miles Bridges (9)	Miles Bridges (8)	Spectrum Center; 13,889	5–3
9	November 3	@ Golden State	L 92–114	Miles Bridges (32)	Gordon Hayward (11)	LaMelo Ball (8)	Chase Center; 18,064	5–4
10	November 5	@ Sacramento	L 110–140	Gordon Hayward (25)	Mason Plumlee (6)	LaMelo Ball (13)	Golden 1 Center; 14,905	5–5
11	November 7	@ L.A. Clippers	L 106–120	LaMelo Ball (21)	Terry Rozier (8)	Miles Bridges (6)	Staples Center; 15,781	5–6
12	November 8	@ L.A. Lakers	L 123–126 (OT)	Terry Rozier (29)	LaMelo Ball (15)	LaMelo Ball (11)	Staples Center; 18,997	5–7
13	November 10	@ Memphis	W 118–108	Kelly Oubre Jr. (37)	Ball, Bridges (9)	LaMelo Ball (8)	FedExForum; 13,880	6–7
14	November 12	New York	W 106–94	Miles Bridges (24)	LaMelo Ball (17)	LaMelo Ball (9)	Spectrum Center; 19,257	7–7
15	November 14	Golden State	W 106–102	Miles Bridges (22)	Bridges, Martin (8)	Mason Plumlee (6)	Spectrum Center; 19,559	8–7
16	November 17	Washington	W 97–87	Terry Rozier (19)	Mason Plumlee (13)	LaMelo Ball (14)	Spectrum Center; 14,402	9–7
17	November 19	Indiana	W 121–118	LaMelo Ball (32)	LaMelo Ball (11)	LaMelo Ball (8)	Spectrum Center; 16,787	10–7
18	November 20	@ Atlanta	L 105–115	Miles Bridges (35)	Ball, Bridges (10)	LaMelo Ball (11)	State Farm Arena; 17,320	10–8
19	November 22	@ Washington	W 109–103	Terry Rozier (32)	LaMelo Ball (13)	LaMelo Ball (7)	Capital One Arena; 16,575	11–8
20	November 24	@ Orlando	W 106–99	Terry Rozier (27)	Miles Bridges (9)	Bridges, Martin (6)	Amway Center; 16,114	12–8
21	November 26	Minnesota	W 133–115	Kelly Oubre Jr. (27)	Jalen McDaniels (8)	LaMelo Ball (13)	Spectrum Center; 19,314	13–8
22	November 27	@ Houston	L 143–146 (OT)	Terry Rozier (31)	LaMelo Ball (11)	LaMelo Ball (13)	Toyota Center; 14,687	13–9
23	November 29	@ Chicago	L 119–133	Terry Rozier (31)	Miles Bridges (8)	LaMelo Ball (13)	United Center; 21,366	13–10

December: 6–7 (home: 2–2; road: 4–5)

Game	Date	Team	Score	High points	High rebounds	High assists	Location Attendance	Record
24	December 1	@ Milwaukee	L 125–127	LaMelo Ball (36)	P. J. Washington (10)	LaMelo Ball (9)	Fiserv Forum; 17,341	13–11
25	December 5	@ Atlanta	W 130–127	Miles Bridges (32)	P. J. Washington (11)	Ish Smith (7)	State Farm Arena; 16,383	14–11
26	December 6	Philadelphia	L 124–127	Kelly Oubre Jr. (35)	P. J. Washington (8)	Gordon Hayward (9)	Spectrum Center; 14,462	14–12
27	December 8	Philadelphia	L 106–110	Gordon Hayward (31)	Kelly Oubre Jr. (10)	Gordon Hayward (7)	Spectrum Center; 15,709	14–13
28	December 10	Sacramento	W 124–123	James Bouknight (24)	Cody Martin (8)	Miles Bridges (8)	Spectrum Center; 16,335	15–13
29	December 13	@ Dallas	L 96–120	Oubre Jr., Rozier (20)	Miles Bridges (10)	Gordon Hayward (6)	American Airlines Center; 19,213	15–14
30	December 15	@ San Antonio	W 131–115	Gordon Hayward (41)	Jalen McDaniels (10)	Miles Bridges (8)	AT&T Center; 14,354	16–14
31	December 17	@ Portland	W 125–116	LaMelo Ball (27)	Miles Bridges (6)	Miles Bridges (11)	Moda Center; 18,399	16–15
32	December 19	@ Phoenix	L 106–137	Miles Bridges (26)	LaMelo Ball (10)	LaMelo Ball (7)	Footprint Center; 17,071	16–16
33	December 20	@ Utah	L 102–112	Miles Bridges (21)	Miles Bridges (11)	LaMelo Ball (11)	Vivint Arena; 18,306	16–17
34	December 23	@ Denver	W 115–107	Kelly Oubre Jr. (23)	P. J. Washington (9)	P. J. Washington (5)	Ball Arena; 17,003	17–17
35	December 27	Houston	W 123–99	Terry Rozier (27)	Mason Plumlee (9)	LaMelo Ball (7)	Spectrum Center; 19,349	18–17
36	December 29	@ Indiana	W 116–108	Terry Rozier (35)	Ball, Plumlee (12)	LaMelo Ball (9)	Gainbridge Fieldhouse; 17,608	19–17

January: 9–6 (home: 5–3; road: 4–3)

Game	Date	Team	Score	High points	High rebounds	High assists	Location Attendance	Record
37	January 2	Phoenix	L 99–133	LaMelo Ball (17)	Hayward, Richards (7)	Ish Smith (8)	Spectrum Center; 19,088	19–18
38	January 3	@ Washington	L 121–124	Gordon Hayward (27)	Miles Bridges (14)	Mason Plumlee (7)	Capital One Arena; 8,902	19–19
39	January 5	Detroit	W 140–111	Kelly Oubre Jr. (32)	Ball, Washington (8)	LaMelo Ball (12)	Spectrum Center; 14,427	20–19
40	January 8	Milwaukee	W 114–106	Terry Rozier (28)	Ball, Bridges, Washington (8)	LaMelo Ball (8)	Spectrum Center; 19,139	21–19
41	January 10	Milwaukee	W 103–99	Terry Rozier (27)	Miles Bridges (11)	P. J. Washington (5)	Spectrum Center; 14,253	22–19
42	January 12	@ Philadelphia	W 109–98	Gordon Hayward (30)	Bridges, Washington (8)	LaMelo Ball (8)	Wells Fargo Center; 20,317	23–19
43	January 14	Orlando	L 109–116	LaMelo Ball (23)	Mason Plumlee (10)	LaMelo Ball (8)	Spectrum Center; 16,011	23–20
44	January 17	@ New York	W 97–87	Miles Bridges (38)	Miles Bridges (12)	Terry Rozier (7)	Madison Square Garden; 19,812	24–20
45	January 19	@ Boston	W 111–102	Terry Rozier (28)	Ball, Plumlee (10)	Ball, Rozier (10)	TD Garden; 19,156	25–20
46	January 21	Oklahoma City	W 121–98	Terry Rozier (24)	Miles Bridges (14)	Terry Rozier (9)	Spectrum Center; 15,835	26–20
47	January 23	Atlanta	L 91–113	Ball, Bridges (19)	Mason Plumlee (11)	Terry Rozier (7)	Spectrum Center; 15,822	26–21
48	January 25	@ Toronto	L 113–125	LaMelo Ball (25)	Mason Plumlee (9)	LaMelo Ball (7)	Scotiabank Arena; 0	26–22
49	January 26	@ Indiana	W 158–126	Kelly Oubre Jr. (39)	LaMelo Ball (10)	LaMelo Ball (13)	Gainbridge Fieldhouse; 14,116	27–22
50	January 28	L.A. Lakers	W 117–114	Miles Bridges (26)	Mason Plumlee (17)	Bridges, Plumlee (6)	Spectrum Center; 19,469	28–22
51	January 30	L.A. Clippers	L 90–115	LaMelo Ball (23)	Mason Plumlee (10)	LaMelo Ball (10)	Spectrum Center; 19,600	28–23

February: 2–10 (home: 1–7; road: 1–3)

Game	Date	Team	Score	High points	High rebounds	High assists	Location Attendance	Record
52	February 2	@ Boston	L 107–113	LaMelo Ball (38)	Mason Plumlee (17)	LaMelo Ball (9)	TD Garden; 19,156	28–24
53	February 4	Cleveland	L 101–102	Terry Rozier (24)	Mason Plumlee (11)	Miles Bridges (7)	Spectrum Center; 17,733	28–25
54	February 5	Miami	L 86–104	Terry Rozier (16)	Mason Plumlee (10)	Miles Bridges (5)	Spectrum Center; 19,420	28–26
55	February 7	Toronto	L 101–116	Miles Bridges (25)	P. J. Washington (9)	LaMelo Ball (9)	Spectrum Center; 14,102	28–27
56	February 9	Chicago	L 109–121	LaMelo Ball (33)	Mason Plumlee (11)	Terry Rozier (6)	Spectrum Center; 19,099	28-28
57	February 11	@ Detroit	W 141–119	LaMelo Ball (31)	Plumlee, Rozier (10)	LaMelo Ball (12)	Little Caesars Arena; 20,088	29–28
58	February 12	Memphis	L 118–125	Terry Rozier (35)	Mason Plumlee (12)	Terry Rozier (9)	Spectrum Center; 19,454	29–29
59	February 15	@ Minnesota	L 120–126 (OT)	Miles Bridges (28)	Mason Plumlee (17)	Mason Plumlee (9)	Target Center; 17,136	29–30
60	February 17	Miami	L 107–111 (2OT)	Miles Bridges (29)	P. J. Washington (14)	LaMelo Ball (14)	Spectrum Center; 17,029	29–31
61	February 25	Toronto	W 125–93	Oubre Jr., Rozier (23)	Bridges, Harrell, Plumlee (10)	Terry Rozier (9)	Spectrum Center; 17,577	30–31
62	February 27	Detroit	L 126–127 (OT)	Terry Rozier (33)	Miles Bridges (10)	LaMelo Ball (7)	Spectrum Center; 15,348	30–32
63	February 28	@ Milwaukee	L 106–130	LaMelo Ball (24)	Kelly Oubre Jr. (7)	Terry Rozier (8)	Fiserv Forum; 17,341	30–33

March: 10–4 (home: 5–4; road: 5–0)

Game	Date	Team	Score	High points	High rebounds	High assists	Location Attendance	Record
64	March 2	@ Cleveland	W 119–98	Terry Rozier (29)	Montrezl Harrell (9)	Terry Rozier (7)	Rocket Mortgage FieldHouse; 19,019	31–33
65	March 5	San Antonio	W 123–117	Terry Rozier (31)	Mason Plumlee (13)	LaMelo Ball (7)	Spectrum Center; 18,941	32–33
66	March 8	Brooklyn	L 121–132	Bridges, Rozier (30)	Rozier, Washington (8)	LaMelo Ball (7)	Spectrum Center; 17,230	32–34
67	March 9	Boston	L 101–115	Bridges, Washington (17)	Mason Plumlee (15)	Mason Plumlee (6)	Spectrum Center; 18,066	32–35
68	March 11	@ New Orleans	W 142–120	Miles Bridges (26)	Miles Bridges (8)	Ball, Bridges (9)	Smoothie King Center; 16,838	33–35
69	March 14	@ Oklahoma City	W 134–116	Terry Rozier (30)	Mason Plumlee (11)	Mason Plumlee (8)	Paycom Center; 15,810	34–35
70	March 16	Atlanta	W 116–106	LaMelo Ball (22)	Mason Plumlee (10)	LaMelo Ball (11)	Spectrum Center; 16,648	35–35
71	March 19	Dallas	W 128–109	Miles Bridges (23)	Bridges, Martin (8)	LaMelo Ball (7)	Spectrum Center; 19,279	36–35
72	March 21	New Orleans	W 106–103	Ball, Rozier (17)	Mason Plumlee (10)	LaMelo Ball (9)	Spectrum Center; 13,351	37–35
73	March 23	New York	L 106–121	LaMelo Ball (32)	Ball, Bridges (9)	Miles Bridges (9)	Spectrum Center; 16,290	37–36
74	March 25	Utah	W 107–101	Miles Bridges (26)	Bridges, Plumlee (11)	Ball, Washington (5)	Spectrum Center; 19,162	38–36
75	March 27	@ Brooklyn	W 119–110	LaMelo Ball (33)	P. J. Washington (11)	LaMelo Ball (9)	Barclays Center; 18,166	39–36
76	March 28	Denver	L 109–113	Miles Bridges (27)	Miles Bridges (11)	LaMelo Ball (11)	Spectrum Center; 17,614	39–37
77	March 30	@ New York	W 125–114	Miles Bridges (31)	Bridges, Washington (6)	LaMelo Ball (15)	Madison Square Garden; 19,812	40–37

April: 3–2 (home: 2–0; road: 1–2)

Game	Date	Team	Score	High points	High rebounds	High assists	Location Attendance	Record
78	April 2	@ Philadelphia	L 114–144	Miles Bridges (20)	Miles Bridges (5)	Terry Rozier (6)	Wells Fargo Center; 21,509	40–38
79	April 5	@ Miami	L 115–144	Miles Bridges (29)	Bridges, Plumlee, Washington (6)	LaMelo Ball (14)	FTX Arena; 19,600	40–39
80	April 7	Orlando	W 128–101	LaMelo Ball (26)	Ball, Rozier (8)	LaMelo Ball (9)	Spectrum Center; 16,427	41–39
81	April 8	@ Chicago	W 133–117	LaMelo Ball (24)	Montrezl Harrell (6)	LaMelo Ball (9)	United Center; 21,461	42–39
82	April 10	Washington	W 124–108	Terry Rozier (25)	LaMelo Ball (10)	LaMelo Ball (9)	Spectrum Center; 18,465	43–39

2021–22 season schedule

=== Play-in ===
2021 preseason game log
Total: 0–1 (Home: 0–0; Road: 0–1)
Play-in: 0–1 (home: 0–0; road: 0–1)

Game	Date	Team	Score	High points	High rebounds	High assists	Location Attendance	Record
1	April 13	@ Atlanta	L 103–132	Lamelo Ball (26)	Martin, Washington (6)	Lamelo Ball (7)	State Farm Arena; 18,137	0–1

2021–22 season schedule

== Player statistics ==
=== Regular season ===
Player	POS	GP	GS	MP	REB	AST	STL	BLK	PTS	MPG	RPG	APG	SPG	BPG	PPG
Miles Bridges	PF	80	80	2,837	559	300	74	67	1,613	35.5	7.0	3.8	.9	.8	20.2
Kelly Oubre Jr.	SF	76	13	1,999	302	84	77	31	1,137	26.3	4.0	1.1	1.0	.4	15.0
LaMelo Ball	PG	75	75	2,422	501	571	119	30	1,508	32.3	6.7	7.6	1.6	.4	20.1
Terry Rozier	SG	73	73	2,458	315	326	93	25	1,408	33.7	4.3	4.5	1.3	.3	19.3
Mason Plumlee	C	73	73	1,793	565	226	61	52	477	24.6	7.7	3.1	.8	.7	6.5
Cody Martin	SF	71	11	1,866	285	179	88	32	544	26.3	4.0	2.5	1.2	.5	7.7
P. J. Washington	PF	65	28	1,768	337	147	57	61	668	27.2	5.2	2.3	.9	.9	10.3
Jalen McDaniels	SF	55	2	895	170	58	26	22	340	16.3	3.1	1.1	.5	.4	6.2
Nick Richards	C	50	5	367	86	13	9	21	150	7.3	1.7	.3	.2	.4	3.0
Gordon Hayward	SF	49	48	1,564	224	177	47	22	778	31.9	4.6	3.6	1.0	.4	15.9
Ish Smith^{†}	PG	37	1	511	57	98	20	10	168	13.8	1.5	2.6	.5	.3	4.5
JT Thor	PF	33	0	262	43	19	8	11	67	7.9	1.3	.6	.2	.3	2.0
James Bouknight	SG	31	0	304	52	26	7	1	142	9.8	1.7	.8	.2	.0	4.6
Montrezl Harrell^{†}	C	25	0	524	122	49	11	12	285	21.0	4.9	2.0	.4	.5	11.4
Kai Jones	C	21	0	63	11	4	1	2	22	3.0	.5	.2	.0	.1	1.0
Isaiah Thomas^{†}	PG	17	0	219	21	24	7	3	141	12.9	1.2	1.4	.4	.2	8.3
Vernon Carey Jr.^{†}	C	4	1	17	5	0	1	0	8	4.3	1.3	.0	.3	.0	2.0
Scottie Lewis	SG	2	0	7	0	1	1	0	1	3.5	.0	.5	.5	.0	.5
Arnoldas Kulboka	SF	2	0	5	0	0	0	0	0	2.5	.0	.0	.0	.0	.0

- ^{†} Denotes player spent time with another team in the season. Stats reflect time with the Hornets only.

== Transactions ==
=== Trades ===
July 30, 2021	To Charlotte Hornets: Kai Jones	To New York Knicks: Future first–round pick

=== Free agents ===
==== Re-signed ====
Player	Signed	Ref.

==== Additions ====
Player	Signed	Former team	Ref.
James Bouknight	August 3, 2021	UConn Huskies	
D. J. Carton	August 7, 2021	Marquette Golden Eagles	
Wes Iwundu	August 7, 2021	New Orleans Pelicans	
Kai Jones	August 3, 2021	Texas Longhorns	
Arnoldas Kulboka (TW)	August 3, 2021	Bilbao Basket	
Scottie Lewis (TW)	August 3, 2021	Florida Gators	
Kelly Oubre Jr.	August 7, 2021	Golden State Warriors	
Mason Plumlee	August 6, 2021	Detroit Pistons	
Ish Smith	August 7, 2021	Washington Wizards	
JT Thor	August 6, 2021	Auburn Tigers	

==== Subtractions ====
Player	Reason left	New team	Ref.
