= 2021–22 Denver Nuggets season =

2021–22 NBA season by team

- Head coach: Michael Malone
- President: Tim Connelly
- General manager: Calvin Booth
- Owners: Ann Walton Kroenke
- Arena: Ball Arena

Results
- Record: 48–34 (.585)
- Place: Division: 2nd (Northwest); Conference: 6th (Western)
- Playoff finish: First round (lost to Warriors 1–4)
- Stats at Basketball Reference

Local media
- Television: Altitude Sports and Entertainment
- Radio: KKSE

The 2021–22 Denver Nuggets season was the 46th season of the franchise in the National Basketball Association (NBA), and the franchise's 55th season of existence overall. The Nuggets entered the season after a second-round loss at the hands of the eventual Western Conference champion Phoenix Suns. They finished the season 48–34. Still, they lost to the eventual champion Golden State Warriors in five games in the first round. The two teams previously met in the first round of the 2013 playoffs in which the Warriors defeated the Nuggets in six games. Nikola Jokić was awarded the NBA MVP Award for the second consecutive season.

Injuries marred the team as it missed two of its young core stars. Jamal Murray was rumored to return from his torn ACL suffered the previous April but sat out the entire campaign, while Michael Porter Jr. would appear in only nine games before needing surgery again on his back in November. Porter Jr. was set to be the secondary scoring option to Jokić in the absence of Murray. The absences of Murray and Porter led to the team having to rely on increased production from Aaron Gordon and Will Barton.

== Draft ==
Round	Pick	Player	Position	Nationality	School / club team
1	26	Nah'Shon Hyland	PG/SG	United States	VCU (So.)

The Nuggets owned one first-round pick in the draft, having their second-round pick traded to the Oklahoma City Thunder via the Philadelphia 76ers and Golden State Warriors.

== Roster ==
2021–22 Denver Nuggets roster
Players

Pos.	No.	Player	Height	Weight	DOB	From
G	5	Will Barton	6 ft 6 in (1.98 m)	181 lb (82 kg)	1991-01-06	Memphis
G	7	Facundo Campazzo	5 ft 10 in (1.78 m)	195 lb (88 kg)	1991-03-23	Argentina
F	31	Vlatko Čančar	6 ft 8 in (2.03 m)	236 lb (107 kg)	1997-04-10	Slovenia
C	4	DeMarcus Cousins	6 ft 11 in (2.11 m)	270 lb (122 kg)	1990-08-13	Kentucky
G	6	Bryn Forbes	6 ft 2 in (1.88 m)	195 lb (88 kg)	1993-07-23	Michigan State
F	50	Aaron Gordon	6 ft 9 in (2.06 m)	235 lb (107 kg)	1995-09-16	Arizona
F	0	JaMychal Green	6 ft 8 in (2.03 m)	227 lb (103 kg)	1990-06-21	Alabama
F	32	Jeff Green	6 ft 8 in (2.03 m)	235 lb (107 kg)	1986-08-28	Georgetown
G	00	Markus Howard (TW)	5 ft 10 in (1.78 m)	175 lb (79 kg)	1999-03-03	Marquette
G	3	Bones Hyland	6 ft 2 in (1.88 m)	169 lb (77 kg)	2000-09-14	VCU
C	15	Nikola Jokić	7 ft 0 in (2.13 m)	284 lb (129 kg)	1995-02-19	Serbia
G	11	Monté Morris	6 ft 2 in (1.88 m)	183 lb (83 kg)	1995-06-27	Iowa State
G	27	Jamal Murray	6 ft 3 in (1.91 m)	215 lb (98 kg)	1997-02-23	Kentucky
F/C	22	Zeke Nnaji	6 ft 11 in (2.11 m)	240 lb (109 kg)	2001-01-09	Arizona
F	1	Michael Porter	6 ft 10 in (2.08 m)	218 lb (99 kg)	1998-06-29	Missouri
G	9	Davon Reed (TW)	6 ft 5 in (1.96 m)	208 lb (94 kg)	1995-06-11	Miami (FL)
G	25	Austin Rivers	6 ft 4 in (1.93 m)	200 lb (91 kg)	1992-08-01	Duke

Coaches
Head coach
- Michael Malone
Assistant(s)
- David Adelman
- John Beckett
- Ryan Bowen
- Jordi Fernández
- Popeye Jones
- Charles Klask
- Ognjen Stojaković
- Elvis Valcarcel

Legend
- (DP) Unsigned draft pick
- (FA) Free agent
- (S) Suspended
- (GL) On assignment to G League
- (TW) Two-way affiliate player
- Injured

Roster
Updated: February 25, 2022

== Standings ==
=== Division ===
Northwest Division	W	L	PCT	GB	Home	Road	Div	GP
y – Utah Jazz	49	33	.598	–	29‍–‍12	20‍–‍21	15–1	82
x – Denver Nuggets	48	34	.585	1.0	23‍–‍18	25‍–‍16	6–10	82
x – Minnesota Timberwolves	46	36	.561	3.0	26‍–‍15	20‍–‍21	12–4	82
Portland Trail Blazers	27	55	.329	22.0	17‍–‍24	10‍–‍31	1–15	82
Oklahoma City Thunder	24	58	.293	25.0	12‍–‍29	12‍–‍29	6–10	82

=== Conference ===
Western Conference
#	Team	W	L	PCT	GB	GP
1	z – Phoenix Suns *	64	18	.780	–	82
2	y – Memphis Grizzlies *	56	26	.683	8.0	82
3	x – Golden State Warriors	53	29	.646	11.0	82
4	x – Dallas Mavericks	52	30	.634	12.0	82
5	y – Utah Jazz *	49	33	.598	15.0	82
6	x – Denver Nuggets	48	34	.585	16.0	82
7	x – Minnesota Timberwolves	46	36	.561	18.0	82
8	pi – Los Angeles Clippers	42	40	.512	22.0	82
9	x – New Orleans Pelicans	36	46	.439	28.0	82
10	pi − San Antonio Spurs	34	48	.415	30.0	82
11	Los Angeles Lakers	33	49	.402	31.0	82
12	Sacramento Kings	30	52	.366	34.0	82
13	Portland Trail Blazers	27	55	.329	37.0	82
14	Oklahoma City Thunder	24	58	.293	40.0	82
15	Houston Rockets	20	62	.244	44.0	82

== Game log ==
=== Preseason ===
2021 preseason game log
Total: 1–4 (home: 0–3; road: 1–1)
Preseason: 1–4 (home: 0–3; road: 1–1)

Game	Date	Team	Score	High points	High rebounds	High assists	Location Attendance	Record
1	October 4	@ L.A. Clippers	L 102–103	Michael Porter Jr. (23)	JaMychal Green (8)	Monté Morris (6)	Staples Center; 7,825	0–1
2	October 6	@ Golden State	L 116–118	Nikola Jokić (17)	Nikola Jokić (10)	Nah'Shon Hyland (6)	Chase Center; 16,923	0–2
3	October 8	Minnesota	L 112–114 (OT)	Nah'Shon Hyland (21)	Nikola Jokić (9)	Nikola Jokić (10)	Ball Arena; 11,927	0–3
3	October 13	@ Oklahoma City	L 99–108	Nikola Jokić (22)	Nikola Jokić (12)	Campazzo, Jokić (5)	Paycom Center; N/A (Note: Spectators were in attendance, but the exact number was not reported.)	0–4
4	October 14	@ Oklahoma City	W 113–107	Markus Howard (31)	Bol Bol (12)	Nah'Shon Hyland (7)	Paycom Center; N/A	1–4

2021–22 preseason schedule

=== Regular season ===
2021–22 game log
Total: 48–34 (home: 23–18; road: 25–16)
October: 4–2 (home: 2–1; road: 2–1)

Game	Date	Team	Score	High points	High rebounds	High assists	Location Attendance	Record
1	October 20	@ Phoenix	W 110–98	Nikola Jokić (27)	Nikola Jokić (13)	Barton, Porter Jr. (5)	Footprint Center; 16,074	1–0
2	October 22	San Antonio	W 102–96	Nikola Jokić (32)	Nikola Jokić (16)	Nikola Jokić (7)	Ball Arena; 19,520	2–0
3	October 25	Cleveland	L 87–99	Nikola Jokić (24)	Nikola Jokić (19)	Monté Morris (6)	Ball Arena; 14,221	2–1
4	October 26	@ Utah	L 110–122	Nikola Jokić (24)	Michael Porter Jr. (9)	Nikola Jokić (6)	Vivint Arena; 18,306	2–2
5	October 29	Dallas	W 106–75	Will Barton (17)	Nikola Jokić (16)	Nikola Jokić (8)	Ball Arena; 18,315	3–2
6	October 30	@ Minnesota	W 93–91	Nikola Jokić (26)	Nikola Jokić (19)	Nikola Jokić (7)	Target Center; 17,136	4–2

November: 6–8 (home: 5–3; road: 1–5)

Game	Date	Team	Score	High points	High rebounds	High assists	Location Attendance	Record
7	November 1	@ Memphis	L 97–106	Nikola Jokić (23)	Aaron Gordon (10)	Nikola Jokić (7)	FedExForum; 12,683	4–3
8	November 3	@ Memphis	L 106–108	Nikola Jokić (34)	Jokić, Porter Jr. (11)	Will Barton (7)	FedExForum; 12,977	4–4
9	November 6	Houston	W 95–94	Nikola Jokić (28)	Nikola Jokić (14)	Will Barton (6)	Ball Arena; 16,046	5–4
10	November 8	Miami	W 113–96	Barton, Jokić (25)	Nikola Jokić (15)	Nikola Jokić (10)	Ball Arena; 15,577	6–4
11	November 10	Indiana	W 101–98	Will Barton (30)	Aaron Gordon (9)	Hyland, Morris (4)	Ball Arena; 15,232	7–4
12	November 12	Atlanta	W 105–96	Aaron Gordon (23)	Nikola Jokić (19)	Nikola Jokić (10)	Ball Arena; 16,849	8–4
13	November 14	Portland	W 124–95	Nikola Jokić (28)	Zeke Nnaji (10)	Nikola Jokić (9)	Ball Arena; 14,583	9–4
14	November 15	@ Dallas	L 101–111	Nikola Jokić (35)	Nikola Jokić (16)	Monté Morris (8)	American Airlines Center; 19,797	9–5
15	November 18	Philadelphia	L 89–103	Nikola Jokić (30)	Nikola Jokić (10)	Will Barton (8)	Ball Arena; 14,547	9–6
16	November 19	Chicago	L 108–114	Aaron Gordon (28)	PJ Dozier (10)	Monté Morris (5)	Ball Arena; 19,520	9–7
17	November 21	@ Phoenix	L 97–126	Jeff Green (19)	Aaron Gordon (10)	Gordon, Ja. Green (4)	Footprint Center; 16,072	9–8
18	November 23	@ Portland	L 100–119	Jeff Green (24)	Will Barton (8)	Will Barton (7)	Moda Center; 17,052	9–9
19	November 26	Milwaukee	L 109–120	Aaron Gordon (18)	Barton, Gordon (9)	Monté Morris (8)	Ball Arena; 19,520	9–10
20	November 29	@ Miami	W 120–111	Nikola Jokić (24)	Nikola Jokić (15)	Nikola Jokić (7)	FTX Arena; 19,600	10–10

December: 7–6 (home: 1–2; road: 6–4)

Game	Date	Team	Score	High points	High rebounds	High assists	Location Attendance	Record
21	December 1	@ Orlando	L 103–108	Monté Morris (22)	Nikola Jokić (15)	Nikola Jokić (7)	Amway Center; 14,191	10–11
22	December 4	@ New York	W 113–99	Nikola Jokić (32)	Nikola Jokić (11)	Will Barton (6)	Madison Square Garden; 18,272	11–11
23	December 6	@ Chicago	L 97–109	Barton, Morris (19)	Jeff Green (13)	Nikola Jokić (15)	United Center; 21,236	11–12
24	December 8	@ New Orleans	W 120–114 (OT)	Nikola Jokić (39)	Nikola Jokić (11)	Nikola Jokić (11)	Smoothie King Center; 15,035	12–12
25	December 9	@ San Antonio	L 111–123	Aaron Gordon (25)	Nikola Jokić (13)	Nikola Jokić (10)	AT&T Center; 12,855	12–13
26	December 11	@ San Antonio	W 127–112	Nikola Jokić (35)	Nikola Jokić (17)	Campazzo, Jokić (8)	AT&T Center; 14,607	13–13
27	December 13	Washington	W 113–107	Nikola Jokić (28)	Nikola Jokić (19)	Nikola Jokić (9)	Ball Arena; 14,632	14–13
28	December 15	Minnesota	L 107–124	Nikola Jokić (27)	Nikola Jokić (10)	Nikola Jokić (11)	Ball Arena; 15,365	14–14
29	December 17	@ Atlanta	W 133–115	Nah'Shon Hyland (24)	Nikola Jokić (10)	Facundo Campazzo (8)	State Farm Arena; 16,114	15–14
—	December 19	@ Brooklyn	Postponed due to COVID-19 pandemic					
30	December 22	@ Oklahoma City	L 94–108	Nikola Jokić (13)	Ja. Green, Jokić (7)	Facundo Campazzo (6)	Paycom Center; 14,932	15–15
31	December 23	Charlotte	L 107–115	Nikola Jokić (29)	Nikola Jokić (21)	Campazzo, Jokić (5)	Ball Arena; 17,003	15–16
32	December 26	@ L. A. Clippers	W 103–100	Nikola Jokić (26)	Nikola Jokić (22)	Nikola Jokić (8)	Crypto.com Arena; 17,759	16–16
33	December 28	@ Golden State	W 89–86	Nikola Jokić (22)	Nikola Jokić (19)	Facundo Campazzo (7)	Chase Center; 18,064	17–16
—	December 30	Golden State	Postponed due to COVID-19 pandemic					

January: 11–5 (home: 5–3; road: 6–2)

Game	Date	Team	Score	High points	High rebounds	High assists	Location Attendance	Record
34	1 January	@ Houston	W 124–111	Nikola Jokić (24)	Nikola Jokić (11)	Facundo Campazzo (12)	Toyota Center; 18,055	18–16
35	3 January	@ Dallas	L 89–103	Nikola Jokić (27)	Nikola Jokić (16)	Will Barton (6)	American Airlines Center; 19,767	18–17
36	5 January	Utah	L 109–115	Nikola Jokić (26)	Nikola Jokić (21)	Nikola Jokić (11)	Ball Arena; 14,056	18–18
37	7 January	Sacramento	W 121–111	Nikola Jokić (33)	Nikola Jokić (10)	Campazzo, Jokić (7)	Ball Arena; 15,966	19–18
38	9 January	@ Oklahoma City	W 99–95	Jokić, Rivers (22)	Nikola Jokić (18)	Facundo Campazzo (8)	Paycom Center; 14,772	20–18
39	11 January	@ L. A. Clippers	L 85–87	Aaron Gordon (30)	Nikola Jokić (13)	Nikola Jokić (8)	Crypto.com Arena; 15,077	20–19
40	13 January	Portland	W 140–108	Will Barton (21)	Zeke Nnaji (9)	Facundo Campazzo (12)	Ball Arena; 14,972	21–19
41	15 January	L. A. Lakers	W 133–96	Nah'Shon Hyland (27)	Nikola Jokić (12)	Nikola Jokić (13)	Ball Arena; 19,520	22–19
42	16 January	Utah	L 102–125	Nikola Jokić (25)	Nikola Jokić (15)	Nikola Jokić (14)	Ball Arena; 15,647	22–20
43	19 January	L. A. Clippers	W 130–128 (OT)	Nikola Jokić (49)	Nikola Jokić (14)	Nikola Jokić (10)	Ball Arena; 14,547	23–20
44	21 January	Memphis	L 118–122	Will Barton (27)	Nikola Jokić (11)	Nikola Jokić (12)	Ball Arena; 17,009	23–21
45	23 January	Detroit	W 117–111	Nikola Jokić (34)	Nikola Jokić (9)	Nikola Jokić (8)	Ball Arena; 14,060	24–21
46	25 January	@ Detroit	W 110–105	Nikola Jokić (28)	Nikola Jokić (21)	Nikola Jokić (9)	Little Caesars Arena; 16,023	25–21
47	26 January	@ Brooklyn (Note: This game was originally scheduled for December 19)	W 124–118	Nikola Jokić (26)	Barton, Jokić (10)	Nikola Jokić (8)	Barclays Center; 18,011	26–21
48	28 January	@ New Orleans	W 116–105	Nikola Jokić (29)	Nikola Jokić (13)	Nikola Jokić (10)	Smoothie King Center; 15,254	27–21
49	30 January	@ Milwaukee	W 136–100	Aaron Gordon (24)	Nikola Jokić (9)	Nikola Jokić (15)	Fiserv Forum; 17,341	28–21

February: 8–4 (home: 4–1; road: 4–3)

Game	Date	Team	Score	High points	High rebounds	High assists	Location Attendance	Record
50	1 February	@ Minnesota	L 115–130	Nikola Jokić (21)	Nikola Jokić (16)	Nikola Jokić (8)	Target Center; 15,839	28–22
51	2 February	@ Utah	L 104–108	Bryn Forbes (26)	Will Barton (9)	Nah'Shon Hyland (7)	Vivint Arena; 18,306	28–23
52	4 February	New Orleans	L 105–113	Nikola Jokić (25)	Nikola Jokić (12)	Nikola Jokić (9)	Ball Arena; 16,152	28–24
53	6 February	Brooklyn	W 124–104	Nikola Jokić (27)	Nikola Jokić (12)	Nikola Jokić (10)	Ball Arena; 18,241	29–24
54	8 February	New York	W 132–115	Nah'Shon Hyland (22)	Nikola Jokić (11)	Nikola Jokić (7)	Ball Arena; 15,093	30–24
55	11 February	@ Boston	L 102–108	Nikola Jokić (23)	Nikola Jokić (16)	Nikola Jokić (11)	TD Garden; 19,156	30–25
56	12 February	@ Toronto	W 110–109	Nikola Jokić (28)	Nikola Jokić (15)	Nikola Jokić (6)	Scotiabank Arena; 0	31–25
57	14 February	Orlando	W 121–111	Nikola Jokić (26)	Nikola Jokić (15)	Nikola Jokić (7)	Ball Arena; 15,025	32–25
58	16 February	@ Golden State	W 117–116	Nikola Jokić (35)	Nikola Jokić (17)	Nikola Jokić (8)	Chase Center; 18,064	33–25
All-Star Break
59	24 February	@ Sacramento	W 128–110	Will Barton (31)	Nikola Jokić (12)	Nikola Jokić (9)	Golden 1 Center; 15,855	34–25
60	26 February	Sacramento	W 115–110	Aaron Gordon (23)	Nikola Jokić (10)	Nikola Jokić (11)	Ball Arena; 19,520	35–25
61	27 February	@ Portland	W 124–92	JaMychal Green (20)	Nikola Jokić (18)	Nikola Jokić (11)	Moda Center; 17,771	36–25

March: 10–6 (home: 5–5; road: 5–1)

Game	Date	Team	Score	High points	High rebounds	High assists	Location Attendance	Record
62	2 March	Oklahoma City	L 107–119	Nikola Jokić (22)	Nikola Jokić (16)	Will Barton (5)	Ball Arena; 15,167	36–26
63	4 March	Houston	W 116–101	DeMarcus Cousins (31)	Cousins, Ja. Green (9)	Nah'Shon Hyland (5)	Ball Arena; 16,254	37–26
64	6 March	New Orleans	W 138–130 (OT)	Nikola Jokić (46)	Nikola Jokić (12)	Nikola Jokić (11)	Ball Arena; 14,962	38–26
65	7 March	Golden State (Note: This game was originally scheduled for December 30)	W 131–124	Nikola Jokić (32)	Nikola Jokić (15)	Nikola Jokić (13)	Ball Arena; 19,542	39–26
66	9 March	@ Sacramento	W 106–100	Nikola Jokić (38)	Nikola Jokić (18)	Nikola Jokić (7)	Golden 1 Center; 14,697	40–26
67	10 March	Golden State	L 102–113	Nikola Jokić (23)	Nikola Jokić (12)	Nikola Jokić (9)	Ball Arena; 19,520	40–27
68	12 March	Toronto	L 115–127	Nikola Jokić (26)	Nikola Jokić (10)	Hyland, Jokić (7)	Ball Arena; 18,659	40–28
69	14 March	@ Philadelphia	W 114–110	Nikola Jokić (22)	Nikola Jokić (13)	Nikola Jokić (8)	Wells Fargo Center; 21,444	41–28
70	16 March	@ Washington	W 127–109	Nikola Jokić (29)	Nikola Jokić (13)	Nikola Jokić (8)	Capital One Arena; 15,326	42–28
71	18 March	@ Cleveland	L 116–119 (OT)	Nikola Jokić (32)	Nikola Jokić (10)	Nikola Jokić (8)	Rocket Mortgage FieldHouse; 19,432	42–29
72	20 March	Boston	L 104–124	Nikola Jokić (23)	Nikola Jokić (8)	Hyland, Jokić, Morris, Rivers (4)	Ball Arena; 19,602	42–30
73	22 March	L. A. Clippers	W 127–115	Nikola Jokić (30)	Nikola Jokić (14)	Gordon, Jokić (6)	Ball Arena; 18,089	43–30
74	24 March	Phoenix	L 130–140	Nikola Jokić (28)	Cousins, Gordon, Ja. Green Jokić (6)	Will Barton (8)	Ball Arena; 19,520	43–31
75	26 March	Oklahoma City	W 113–107	Nikola Jokić (35)	Nikola Jokić (12)	Nikola Jokić (8)	Ball Arena; 19,520	44–31
76	28 March	@ Charlotte	W 113–109	Nikola Jokić (26)	Nikola Jokić (19)	Nikola Jokić (11)	Spectrum Center; 17,614	45–31
77	30 March	@ Indiana	W 125–118	Nikola Jokić (37)	Nikola Jokić (13)	Nikola Jokić (9)	Gainbridge Fieldhouse; 15,036	46–31

April: 2–3 (home: 1–3; road: 1–0)

Game	Date	Team	Score	High points	High rebounds	High assists	Location Attendance	Record
78	1 April	Minnesota	L 130–136	Nikola Jokić (38)	Nikola Jokić (19)	Nikola Jokić (8)	Ball Arena; 19,612	46–32
79	3 April	@ L. A. Lakers	W 129–118	Nikola Jokić (38)	Nikola Jokić (18)	Monté Morris (10)	Crypto.com Arena; 16,273	47–32
80	5 April	San Antonio	L 97–116	Nikola Jokić (41)	Nikola Jokić (17)	Will Barton (6)	Ball Arena; 17,037	47–33
81	7 April	Memphis	W 122–109	Nikola Jokić (35)	Nikola Jokić (16)	Nah'Shon Hyland (7)	Ball Arena; 19,520	48–33
82	9 April	L. A. Lakers	L 141–146 (OT)	Markus Howard (25)	Cousins & Ja. Green (9)	Nah'Shon Hyland (6)	Ball Arena; 19,520	48–34

2021–22 season schedule

=== Playoffs ===
2022 playoff game log
Total: 1–4 (home: 1–1; road: 0–3)
First Round: 1–4 (home: 1–1; road: 0–3)

Game	Date	Team	Score	High points	High rebounds	High assists	Location Attendance	Series
1	April 16	@ Golden State	L 107–123	Nikola Jokić (25)	Nikola Jokić (10)	Jokić, Morris 6	Chase Center; 18,064	0–1
2	April 18	@ Golden State	L 106–126	Nikola Jokić (26)	Nikola Jokić (11)	Nikola Jokić (4)	Chase Center; 18,064	0–2
3	April 21	Golden State	L 113–118	Nikola Jokić (37)	Nikola Jokić (18)	Monte Morris (6)	Ball Arena; 19,627	0–3
4	April 24	Golden State	W 126–121	Nikola Jokić (37)	Nikola Jokić (8)	Bones Hyland (7)	Ball Arena; 19,628	1–3
5	April 27	@ Golden State	L 98–102	Nikola Jokić (30)	Nikola Jokić (19)	Nikola Jokić (8)	Chase Center; 18,064	1–4

== Player statistics ==
Legend
GP	Games played	GS	Games started	MPG	Minutes per game
FG%	Field-goal percentage	3P%	3-point field-goal percentage	FT%	Free-throw percentage
RPG	Rebounds per game	APG	Assists per game	SPG	Steals per game
BPG	Blocks per game	PPG	Points per game

=== Regular season ===
Denver Nuggets statistics
Player	GP	GS	MPG	FG%	3P%	FT%	RPG	APG	SPG	BPG	PPG
Will Barton	71	71	32.1	.438	.365	.803	4.8	3.9	.8	.4	14.7
Bol Bol	14	0	5.8	.556	.250	.400	1.4	.4	.1	.1	2.4
Facundo Campazzo	65	4	18.2	.361	.301	.769	1.8	3.4	1.0	.4	5.1
Vlatko Čančar	15	1	11.7	.561	.583	.643	2.1	1.1	.1	.2	4.1
Petr Cornelie	13	0	2.9	.333	.125	.750	1.1	.2	.1	.1	1.1
DeMarcus Cousins	31	2	13.9	.456	.324	.736	5.5	1.7	.6	.4	8.9
PJ Dozier	18	0	18.9	.364	.313	.769	3.5	1.6	.6	.3	5.4
James Ennis III	3	0	4.7	.333	.000	.000	.7	1.0	.0	.0	1.3
Bryn Forbes	35	1	17.4	.424	.410	.921	.9	1.0	.2	.1	8.6
Aaron Gordon	75	75	31.7	.520	.335	.743	5.9	2.5	.6	.6	15.0
JaMychal Green	67	8	16.2	.486	.266	.871	4.2	.9	.6	.4	6.4
Jeff Green	75	63	24.7	.524	.315	.833	3.1	1.3	.4	.4	10.3
Markus Howard	31	0	5.7	.386	.400	.870	.4	.2	.3	.0	4.1
Bones Hyland	69	4	19.0	.403	.366	.856	2.7	2.8	.6	.3	10.1
Nikola Jokić	74	74	33.5	.583	.337	.810	13.8	7.9	1.5	.9	27.1
Carlik Jones	2	0	2.0	.500	.000	.000	.0	.0	.0	.0	1.0
Monté Morris	75	74	29.9	.484	.395	.869	3.0	4.4	.7	.2	12.6
Zeke Nnaji	41	1	17.0	.516	.463	.631	3.6	.4	.4	.3	6.6
Michael Porter Jr.	9	9	29.4	.359	.208	.556	6.6	1.9	1.1	.2	9.9
Davon Reed	48	5	13.9	.503	.430	.667	2.3	1.1	.5	.2	4.4
Austin Rivers	67	18	22.1	.417	.342	.727	1.7	1.3	.8	.1	6.0
Rayjon Tucker	3	0	9.7	.500	.000	.750	1.3	1.3	.3	.0	2.0

=== Playoffs ===
Denver Nuggets statistics
Player	GP	GS	MPG	FG%	3P%	FT%	RPG	APG	SPG	BPG	PPG
Will Barton	5	5	34.4	.409	.393	.667	5.6	2.8	.8	.2	13.8
Facundo Campazzo	4	0	3.3	.000	.000	.000	.8	.5	.0	.0	.0
Vlatko Čančar	2	0	4.5	.667	.500	.000	1.0	.5	.0	.0	2.5
DeMarcus Cousins	5	0	11.4	.655	.667	.733	3.4	1.2	.6	.2	10.6
Bryn Forbes	5	0	15.2	.400	.364	.800	.6	1.4	.2	.0	4.0
Aaron Gordon	5	5	32.0	.426	.200	.714	7.2	2.6	.4	1.2	13.8
JaMychal Green	5	0	13.8	.375	.200	1.000	2.4	.4	.0	.2	4.0
Jeff Green	5	5	22.6	.353	.375	.800	3.6	.4	.6	.4	3.8
Bones Hyland	5	0	17.4	.361	.348	.857	2.0	3.2	.2	.0	9.2
Nikola Jokić	5	5	34.2	.575	.278	.848	13.2	5.8	1.6	1.0	31.0
Monté Morris	5	5	31.2	.490	.423	.750	2.2	5.4	1.2	.0	14.0
Zeke Nnaji	2	0	4.5	1.000	1.000	.000	.0	.0	.0	.0	1.5
Austin Rivers	5	0	21.6	.444	.333	1.000	.6	1.2	1.4	.2	4.2

== Transactions ==
=== Overview ===
Players Added

Via draft

- Petr Cornelie
- Nah'Shon Hyland

Via trade

- Bryn Forbes

Via free agency

- Jeff Green
- Davon Reed
- Rayjon Tucker
- Carlik Jones
- James Ennis III
- DeMarcus Cousins
Players Lost

Via trade

- Bol Bol
- PJ Dozier

Via free agency

- Shaquille Harrison
- JaVale McGee
- Paul Millsap
- Rayjon Tucker
- Carlik Jones
- James Ennis III

Waived

- Petr Cornelie

=== Trades ===
January 19, 2022	Three-team trade
January 19, 2022	To Denver Nuggets Bryn Forbes (from San Antonio)	To Boston Celtics Bol Bol (from Denver) PJ Dozier (from Denver)
January 19, 2022	To San Antonio Spurs Juancho Hernangómez (from Boston) 2028 second-round pick (from Denver)

==== Failed Bol Bol trade ====
On 10 January 2022, the Nuggets attempted to trade Bol Bol and draft compensation to the Detroit Pistons for Rodney McGruder. The trade unraveled three days later, however, as Bol failed his physical examination. Thereafter, the transaction was voided; Bol and McGruder stayed with their respective teams. On 19 January, the Nuggets traded Bol again (along with PJ Dozier), this time to the Boston Celtics, as part of a three-team deal.

=== Free agency ===
==== Re-signed ====
Date	Player	Contract terms	Ref.
August 11, 2021	Will Barton	2 Years, $30 million	
August 15, 2021	Markus Howard	Two-way contract	
August 19, 2021	JaMychal Green	2 Years, $16.4 million 2022-23 Player Option	
September 1, 2021	Austin Rivers	1 Year, $2.4 million	
September 28, 2021	Aaron Gordon	4 Years, $87 million	
September 29, 2021	Michael Porter Jr.	5 Years, $172 million Max Extension	

==== Additions ====
Date	Player	Contract terms	Former team	Ref.
August 12, 2021	Jeff Green	2 Years, $9 million 2022–23 Player Option	Brooklyn Nets	
September 17, 2021	Petr Cornelie	Two-way contract	(France) Élan Béarnais	
December 4, 2021; December 19, 2021; December 30, 2021; January 9, 2022	Davon Reed	10-day contract 10-day contract 10-day contract Two-way contract	Grand Rapids Gold	
December 31, 2021	Rayjon Tucker	10-day contract	Minnesota Timberwolves	
January 1, 2022	Carlik Jones	10-day contract	Dallas Mavericks	
January 10, 2022	James Ennis III	10-day contract	Los Angeles Clippers	
January 21, 2022	DeMarcus Cousins	10-day contract	Milwaukee Bucks	

==== Subtractions ====
Date	Player	Reason	New team	Ref.
August 16, 2021	JaVale McGee	Free Agency	Phoenix Suns	
September 10, 2021	Paul Millsap	Free Agency	Brooklyn Nets	
September 27, 2021	Shaquille Harrison	Free Agency	Philadelphia 76ers	
January 9, 2022	Petr Cornelie	Waived	Grand Rapids Gold	
January 11, 2022	Rayjon Tucker	Free Agency	Wisconsin Herd	
January 11, 2022	Carlik Jones	Free Agency	Texas Legends	
January 21, 2022	James Ennis III	Free Agency	(Israel) Hapoel Haifa	
