= 2021–22 Atlanta Hawks season =

- Head coach: Nate McMillan
- President: Travis Schlenk
- General manager: Travis Schlenk
- Owner: Tony Ressler
- Arena: State Farm Arena

Results
- Record: 43–39 (.524)
- Place: Division: 2nd (Southeast); Conference: 9th (Eastern)
- Playoff finish: First round (lost to Heat 1–4)
- Stats at Basketball Reference

Local media
- Television: Bally Sports South; Bally Sports Southeast
- Radio: 92.9 FM "The Game"

The 2021–22 Atlanta Hawks season was the 73rd season of the franchise in the National Basketball Association (NBA) and 54th in Atlanta. The Hawks entered the season with much higher expectations due to their surprising Eastern Conference finals appearance in the previous season, but struggled on defense and hovered around .500 for most of the season. Despite the struggles, the Hawks qualified for the play-in tournament after a win over the Cleveland Cavaliers on April 12. They defeated both the Charlotte Hornets and the Cleveland Cavaliers in the play-in to clinch a playoff berth as the No. 8 seed, but fell to the top-seeded Miami Heat in five games of the first round.

== Draft picks ==
| Round | Pick | Player | Position | Nationality | School/Club team |
|---|---|---|---|---|---|
| 1 | 20 | Jalen Johnson | SF | United States | Duke |
| 2 | 48 | Sharife Cooper | PG | United States | Auburn |

The Hawks entered the draft with one first-round selection and one second-round selection, which was originally owned by the Miami Heat and acquired from the Sacramento Kings. They had traded their original second-round pick to the Brooklyn Nets in 2019.

== Roster ==
2021–22 Atlanta Hawks roster
Players

| Pos. | No. | Player | Height | Weight | DOB | From |
|---|---|---|---|---|---|---|
| G | 45 | Chaundee, Jr. Brown (TW) | 6 ft 5 in (1.96 m) | 215 lb (98 kg) | 1998-12-04 | Michigan |
| G | 13 | Bogdan Bogdanović | 6 ft 6 in (1.98 m) | 225 lb (102 kg) | 1992-08-18 | Serbia |
| C | 15 | Clint Capela | 6 ft 10 in (2.08 m) | 256 lb (116 kg) | 1994-05-18 | Switzerland |
| F | 20 | John Collins | 6 ft 9 in (2.06 m) | 226 lb (103 kg) | 1997-09-23 | Wake Forest |
| G | 2 | Sharife Cooper (TW) | 6 ft 1 in (1.85 m) | 176 lb (80 kg) | 2001-06-11 | Auburn |
| C | 10 | Gorgui Dieng | 6 ft 11 in (2.11 m) | 248 lb (112 kg) | 1990-01-18 | Louisville |
| F | 8 | Danilo Gallinari | 6 ft 10 in (2.08 m) | 236 lb (107 kg) | 1988-08-08 | Italy |
| G | 3 | Kevin Huerter | 6 ft 7 in (2.01 m) | 198 lb (90 kg) | 1998-08-27 | Maryland |
| G/F | 12 | De'Andre Hunter | 6 ft 8 in (2.03 m) | 221 lb (100 kg) | 1997-12-02 | Virginia |
| F | 1 | Jalen Johnson | 6 ft 8 in (2.03 m) | 219 lb (99 kg) | 2001-12-18 | Duke |
| F | 5 | Kevin Knox II | 6 ft 9 in (2.06 m) | 215 lb (98 kg) | 1999-08-11 | Kentucky |
| G/F | 7 | Timothé Luwawu-Cabarrot | 6 ft 7 in (2.01 m) | 215 lb (98 kg) | 1995-05-09 | France |
| G | 4 | Skylar Mays | 6 ft 4 in (1.93 m) | 205 lb (93 kg) | 1997-09-05 | LSU |
| F/C | 17 | Onyeka Okongwu | 6 ft 10 in (2.08 m) | 240 lb (109 kg) | 2000-12-11 | USC |
| G | 6 | Lou Williams | 6 ft 2 in (1.88 m) | 175 lb (79 kg) | 1986-10-27 | South Gwinnett HS (GA) |
| G | 0 | Delon Wright | 6 ft 5 in (1.96 m) | 185 lb (84 kg) | 1992-04-26 | Utah |
| G | 11 | Trae Young | 6 ft 1 in (1.85 m) | 164 lb (74 kg) | 1998-09-19 | Oklahoma |

Coaches
Head coach
- Nate McMillan
Assistant(s)
- Matt Hill
- Chris Jent
- Jamelle McMillan
- Joe Prunty
- Nick Van Exel

Legend
- (DP) Unsigned draft pick
- (FA) Free agent
- (S) Suspended
- (GL) On assignment to G League affiliate
- (TW) Two-way affiliate player
- Injured

Roster
Updated: April 9, 2022

== Standings ==
=== Division ===
| Southeast Division | W | L | PCT | GB | Home | Road | Div | GP |
|---|---|---|---|---|---|---|---|---|
| c – Miami Heat | 53 | 29 | .646 | – | 29‍–‍12 | 24‍–‍17 | 13–3 | 82 |
| x − Atlanta Hawks | 43 | 39 | .524 | 10.0 | 27‍–‍14 | 16‍–‍25 | 9–7 | 82 |
| pi − Charlotte Hornets | 43 | 39 | .524 | 10.0 | 22‍–‍19 | 21‍–‍20 | 8–8 | 82 |
| Washington Wizards | 35 | 47 | .427 | 18.0 | 21‍–‍20 | 14‍–‍27 | 7–9 | 82 |
| Orlando Magic | 22 | 60 | .268 | 31.0 | 12‍–‍29 | 10‍–‍31 | 3–13 | 82 |

=== Conference ===
Eastern Conference
| # | Team | W | L | PCT | GB | GP |
|---|---|---|---|---|---|---|
| 1 | c – Miami Heat * | 53 | 29 | .646 | – | 82 |
| 2 | y – Boston Celtics * | 51 | 31 | .622 | 2.0 | 82 |
| 3 | y – Milwaukee Bucks * | 51 | 31 | .622 | 2.0 | 82 |
| 4 | x – Philadelphia 76ers | 51 | 31 | .622 | 2.0 | 82 |
| 5 | x – Toronto Raptors | 48 | 34 | .585 | 5.0 | 82 |
| 6 | x – Chicago Bulls | 46 | 36 | .561 | 7.0 | 82 |
| 7 | x − Brooklyn Nets | 44 | 38 | .537 | 9.0 | 82 |
| 8 | pi − Cleveland Cavaliers | 44 | 38 | .537 | 9.0 | 82 |
| 9 | x − Atlanta Hawks | 43 | 39 | .524 | 10.0 | 82 |
| 10 | pi − Charlotte Hornets | 43 | 39 | .524 | 10.0 | 82 |
| 11 | New York Knicks | 37 | 45 | .451 | 16.0 | 82 |
| 12 | Washington Wizards | 35 | 47 | .427 | 18.0 | 82 |
| 13 | Indiana Pacers | 25 | 57 | .305 | 28.0 | 82 |
| 14 | Detroit Pistons | 23 | 59 | .280 | 30.0 | 82 |
| 15 | Orlando Magic | 22 | 60 | .268 | 31.0 | 82 |

== Game log ==
=== Preseason ===
2021 preseason game log
Total: 2–2 (home: 1–1; road: 1–1)
Preseason: 2–2 (home: 1–1; road: 1–1)

| Game | Date | Team | Score | High points | High rebounds | High assists | Location Attendance | Record |
|---|---|---|---|---|---|---|---|---|
| 1 | October 4 | @ Miami | L 99–125 | Collins, Gallinari, Young (14) | John Collins (9) | Delon Wright (5) | FTX Arena; 19,600 | 0–1 |
| 2 | October 6 | Cleveland | L 96–99 | Cam Reddish (20) | Gorgui Dieng (11) | Gorgui Dieng (6) | State Farm Arena; 11,158 | 0–2 |
| 3 | October 9 | Memphis | W 91–87 | Bogdanović, Collins (16) | John Collins (12) | Bogdan Bogdanović (5) | FedExForum; 11,027 | 1–2 |
| 4 | October 14 | Miami | W 127–92 | Trae Young (27) | John Collins (11) | Trae Young (15) | State Farm Arena; 12,527 | 2–2 |

2021–22 season schedule

=== Regular season ===
2021–22 game log
Total: 43–39 (home: 27–14; road: 16–25)
October: 3–3 (home: 2–0; road: 1–3)

| Game | Date | Team | Score | High points | High rebounds | High assists | Location Attendance | Record |
|---|---|---|---|---|---|---|---|---|
| 1 | October 21 | Dallas | W 113–87 | Cam Reddish (20) | Clint Capela (13) | Trae Young (14) | State Farm Arena; 17,162 | 1–0 |
| 2 | October 23 | @ Cleveland | L 95–101 | Trae Young (24) | Clint Capela (14) | Trae Young (7) | Rocket Mortgage FieldHouse; 16,846 | 1–1 |
| 3 | October 25 | Detroit | W 122–104 | Trae Young (32) | Gorgui Dieng (12) | Trae Young (9) | State Farm Arena; 14,209 | 2–1 |
| 4 | October 27 | @ New Orleans | W 102–99 | Trae Young (31) | Capela, Collins (12) | Trae Young (7) | Smoothie King Center; 15,541 | 3–1 |
| 5 | October 28 | @ Washington | L 111–122 | John Collins (28) | John Collins (12) | Trae Young (13) | Capital One Arena; 13,653 | 3–2 |
| 6 | October 30 | @ Philadelphia | L 94–122 | Cam Reddish (16) | Clint Capela (12) | Trae Young (10) | Wells Fargo Center; 20,031 | 3–3 |

November: 8–7 (home: 6–2; road: 2–5)

| Game | Date | Team | Score | High points | High rebounds | High assists | Location Attendance | Record |
|---|---|---|---|---|---|---|---|---|
| 7 | November 1 | Washington | W 118–111 | Trae Young (26) | Clint Capela (12) | Bogdanović, Collins, Young (6) | State Farm Arena; 14,632 | 4–3 |
| 8 | November 3 | @ Brooklyn | L 108–117 | De'Andre Hunter (26) | Clint Capela (16) | Trae Young (10) | Barclays Center; 17,323 | 4–4 |
| 9 | November 4 | Utah | L 98–116 | Trae Young (21) | Clint Capela (10) | Trae Young (7) | State Farm Arena; 16,590 | 4–5 |
| 10 | November 6 | @ Phoenix | L 117–121 | Trae Young (31) | Clint Capela (13) | Trae Young (13) | Footprint Center; 15,412 | 4–6 |
| 11 | November 8 | @ Golden State | L 113–127 | Trae Young (28) | Capela, Collins (6) | Trae Young (9) | Chase Center; 18,064 | 4–7 |
| 12 | November 9 | @ Utah | L 98–110 | Kevin Huerter (28) | Clint Capela (12) | Trae Young (6) | Vivint Arena; 18,306 | 4–8 |
| 13 | November 12 | @ Denver | L 96–105 | Trae Young (30) | Clint Capela (13) | Trae Young (9) | Ball Arena; 16,849 | 4–9 |
| 14 | November 14 | Milwaukee | W 120–100 | Trae Young (42) | Clint Capela (13) | Trae Young (10) | State Farm Arena; 16,901 | 5–9 |
| 15 | November 15 | Orlando | W 129–111 | Collins, Young (23) | Clint Capela (16) | Trae Young (6) | State Farm Arena; 13,061 | 6–9 |
| 16 | November 17 | Boston | W 110–99 | John Collins (20) | Clint Capela (12) | Trae Young (11) | State Farm Arena; 16,445 | 7–9 |
| 17 | November 20 | Charlotte | W 115–105 | Clint Capela (20) | Clint Capela (15) | Trae Young (9) | State Farm Arena; 17,320 | 8–9 |
| 18 | November 22 | Oklahoma City | W 113–101 | Trae Young (30) | Clint Capela (14) | Trae Young (6) | State Farm Arena; 15,806 | 9–9 |
| 19 | November 24 | @ San Antonio | W 124–106 | Trae Young (31) | Clint Capela (13) | Trae Young (11) | AT&T Center; 13,161 | 10–9 |
| 20 | November 26 | @ Memphis | W 132–100 | Trae Young (31) | Clint Capela (17) | Trae Young (10) | FedEx Forum; 16,622 | 11–9 |
| 21 | November 27 | New York | L 90–99 | Trae Young (33) | Clint Capela (21) | Trae Young (7) | State Farm Arena; 17,287 | 11–10 |

December: 5–9 (home: 0–7; road: 5–2)

| Game | Date | Team | Score | High points | High rebounds | High assists | Location Attendance | Record |
|---|---|---|---|---|---|---|---|---|
| 22 | December 1 | @ Indiana | W 114–111 | Trae Young (33) | Clint Capela (9) | Trae Young (10) | Gainbridge Fieldhouse; 12,656 | 12–10 |
| 23 | December 3 | Philadelphia | L 96–98 | Trae Young (25) | Clint Capela (11) | Trae Young (10) | State Farm Arena; 17,092 | 12–11 |
| 24 | December 5 | Charlotte | L 127–130 | John Collins (31) | Clint Capela (14) | Trae Young (15) | State Farm Arena; 16,383 | 12–12 |
| 25 | December 6 | @ Minnesota | W 121–110 | Trae Young (29) | Clint Capela (16) | Trae Young (11) | Target Center; 15,736 | 13–12 |
| 26 | December 10 | Brooklyn | L 105–113 | Trae Young (31) | Clint Capela (16) | Tare Young (10) | State Farm Arena; 17,074 | 13–13 |
| 27 | December 13 | Houston | L 126–132 | Trae Young (41) | Clint Capela (16) | Trae Young (9) | State Farm Arena; 15,456 | 13–14 |
| 28 | December 15 | @ Orlando | W 111–99 | Trae Young (28) | Clint Capela (11) | Huerter, Wright (5) | Amway Center; 13,576 | 14–14 |
| 29 | December 17 | Denver | L 115–133 | Trae Young (34) | Clint Capela (11) | Trae Young (10) | State Farm Arena; 16,114 | 14–15 |
| – | December 19 | Cleveland | Postponed (COVID-19) (Makeup date: March 31) | | | | | |
| 30 | December 22 | Orlando | L 98–104 | Cam Reddish (34) | John Collins (12) | Lance Stephenson (5) | State Farm Arena; 15,299 | 14–16 |
| 31 | December 23 | @ Philadelphia | W 98–96 | Cam Reddish (18) | Skylar Mays (11) | Delon Wright (6) | Wells Fargo Center; 20,408 | 15–16 |
| 32 | December 25 | @ New York | L 87–101 | Collins, Wright (20) | Clint Capela (9) | Gorgui Dieng (5) | Madison Square Garden; 19,812 | 15–17 |
| 33 | December 27 | Chicago | L 118–130 | Cam Reddish (33) | Clint Capela (16) | Trae Young (9) | State Farm Arena; 17,049 | 15–18 |
| 34 | December 29 | @ Chicago | L 117–131 | Trae Young (26) | Clint Capela (15) | Trae Young (11) | United Center; 21,372 | 15–19 |
| 35 | December 31 | @ Cleveland | W 121–118 | Trae Young (35) | Clint Capela (23) | Trae Young (11) | Rocket Mortgage FieldHouse; 17,745 | 16–19 |

January: 8–7 (home: 6–3; road: 2–4)

| Game | Date | Team | Score | High points | High rebounds | High assists | Location Attendance | Record |
|---|---|---|---|---|---|---|---|---|
| 36 | January 3 | @ Portland | L 131–136 | Trae Young (56) | Capela, Gallinari (11) | Trae Young (14) | Moda Center; 15,091 | 16–20 |
| 37 | January 5 | @ Sacramento | W 108–102 | Kevin Huerter (25) | Clint Capela (14) | Kevin Huerter (5) | Golden 1 Center; 13,104 | 17–20 |
| 38 | January 7 | @ L.A. Lakers | L 118–134 | Trae Young (25) | Clint Capela (11) | Trae Young (14) | Crypto.com Arena; 18,997 | 17–21 |
| 39 | January 9 | @ L.A. Clippers | L 93–106 | Bogdanović, Young (19) | Onyeka Okongwu (10) | Trae Young (7) | Crypto.com Arena; 14,836 | 17–22 |
| 40 | January 12 | Miami | L 91–115 | John Collins (16) | John Collins (11) | Trae Young (5) | State Farm Arena; 15,355 | 17–23 |
| 41 | January 14 | @ Miami | L 118–124 | Trae Young (24) | Onyeka Okongwu (6) | Trae Young (9) | FTX Arena; 19,600 | 17–24 |
| 42 | January 15 | New York | L 108–117 | Trae Young (29) | Kevin Huerter (6) | Kevin Huerter (6) | State Farm Arena; 16,414 | 17–25 |
| 43 | January 17 | Milwaukee | W 121–114 | Trae Young (30) | John Collins (12) | Trae Young (11) | State Farm Arena; 16,903 | 18–25 |
| 44 | January 19 | Minnesota | W 134–122 | Trae Young (37) | John Collins (12) | Trae Young (14) | State Farm Arena; 15,199 | 19–25 |
| 45 | January 21 | Miami | W 110–108 | Trae Young (28) | De'Andre Hunter (10) | Trae Young (7) | State Farm Arena; 16,385 | 20–25 |
| 46 | January 23 | @ Charlotte | W 113–91 | Trae Young (30) | Clint Capela (8) | John Collins (5) | Spectrum Center; 15,822 | 21–25 |
| 47 | January 26 | Sacramento | W 121–104 | Bogdanović, Okongwu (18) | Danilo Gallinari (9) | Trae Young (10) | State Farm Arena; 15,080 | 22–25 |
| 48 | January 28 | Boston | W 108–92 | Collins, Young (21) | Collins, Young (9) | Trae Young (6) | State Farm Arena; 16,932 | 23–25 |
| 49 | January 30 | L.A. Lakers | W 129–121 | Trae Young (36) | John Collins (11) | Trae Young (12) | State Farm Arena; 17,391 | 24–25 |
| 50 | January 31 | Toronto | L 100–106 | Kevin Huerter (26) | Clint Capela (8) | Delon Wright (7) | State Farm Arena; 14,168 | 24–26 |

February: 5–5 (home: 4–1; road: 1–4)

| Game | Date | Team | Score | High points | High rebounds | High assists | Location Attendance | Record |
|---|---|---|---|---|---|---|---|---|
| 51 | February 3 | Phoenix | W 124–115 | Trae Young (43) | Clint Capela (12) | Bogdan Bogdanović (6) | State Farm Arena; 16,958 | 25–26 |
| 52 | February 4 | @ Toronto | L 114–125 | Collins, Hunter (23) | Clint Capela (9) | Trae Young (13) | Scotiabank Arena; 0 | 25–27 |
| 53 | February 6 | @ Dallas | L 94–103 | John Collins (22) | John Collins (18) | Trae Young (11) | American Airlines Center; 19,887 | 25–28 |
| 54 | February 8 | Indiana | W 133–112 | Trae Young (34) | Clint Capela (12) | Trae Young (11) | State Farm Arena; 14,265 | 26–28 |
| 55 | February 11 | San Antonio | L 121–136 | Bogdan Bogdanović (23) | Clint Capela (11) | Trae Young (11) | State Farm Arena; 17,234 | 26–29 |
| 56 | February 13 | @ Boston | L 95–105 | Trae Young (30) | Clint Capela (17) | Trae Young (10) | TD Garden; 19,156 | 26–30 |
| 57 | February 15 | Cleveland | W 124–116 | Trae Young (41) | Bogdanović, Capela, Wright (7) | Trae Young (9) | State Farm Arena; 15,947 | 27–30 |
| 58 | February 16 | @ Orlando | W 130–109 | Bogdan Bogdanović (23) | Clint Capela (9) | Bogdanović, Young (6) | Amway Center; 14,398 | 28–30 |
| 59 | February 24 | @ Chicago | L 108–112 | Bogdan Bogdanović (27) | Clint Capela (17) | Trae Young (10) | United Center; 21,236 | 28–31 |
| 60 | February 26 | Toronto | W 127–100 | Trae Young (41) | Clint Capela (9) | Trae Young (11) | State Farm Arena; 17,870 | 29–31 |

March: 11–6 (home: 7–1; road: 4–5)

| Game | Date | Team | Score | High points | High rebounds | High assists | Location Attendance | Record |
|---|---|---|---|---|---|---|---|---|
| 61 | March 1 | @ Boston | L 98–107 | Trae Young (31) | Clint Capela (11) | Trae Young (6) | TD Garden; 19,156 | 29–32 |
| 62 | March 3 | Chicago | W 130–124 | Trae Young (39) | Clint Capela (11) | Trae Young (13) | State Farm Arena; 17,522 | 30–32 |
| 63 | March 4 | @ Washington | W 117–114 | De'Andre Hunter (26) | Clint Capela (12) | Trae Young (8) | Capital One Arena; 15,927 | 31–32 |
| 64 | March 7 | @ Detroit | L 110–113 (OT) | Bogdan Bogdanović (22) | Clint Capela (12) | Trae Young (12) | Little Caesars Arena; 14,942 | 31–33 |
| 65 | March 9 | @ Milwaukee | L 115–124 | Trae Young (27) | Clint Capela (9) | Trae Young (11) | Fiserv Forum; 17,341 | 31–34 |
| 66 | March 11 | L.A. Clippers | W 112–106 | Trae Young (27) | Clint Capela (11) | Trae Young (11) | State Farm Arena; 16,862 | 32–34 |
| 67 | March 13 | Indiana | W 131–128 | Trae Young (47) | Onyeka Okongwu (9) | Bogdan Bogdanović (6) | State Farm Arena; 17,038 | 33–34 |
| 68 | March 14 | Portland | W 122–113 | Trae Young (46) | Clint Capela (16) | Trae Young (12) | State Farm Arena; 16,432 | 34–34 |
| 69 | March 16 | @ Charlotte | L 106–116 | De'Andre Hunter (21) | Clint Capela (15) | Trae Young (15) | Spectrum Center; 16,648 | 34–35 |
| 70 | March 18 | Memphis | W 120–105 | Bogdan Bogdanović (30) | Onyeka Okongwu (9) | Kevin Huerter (7) | State Farm Arena; 18,062 | 35–35 |
| 71 | March 20 | New Orleans | L 112–117 | Danilo Gallinari (27) | Clint Capela (10) | Trae Young (10) | State Farm Arena; 17,123 | 35–36 |
| 72 | March 22 | @ New York | W 117–111 | Trae Young (45) | Danilo Gallinari (10) | Trae Young (8) | Madison Square Garden; 19,812 | 36–36 |
| 73 | March 23 | @ Detroit | L 101–122 | Trae Young (21) | Clint Capela (9) | Trae Young (9) | Little Caesars Arena; 16,212 | 36–37 |
| 74 | March 25 | Golden State | W 121–110 | Trae Young (33) | Clint Capela (13) | Trae Young (15) | State Farm Arena; 17,724 | 37–37 |
| 75 | March 28 | @ Indiana | W 132–123 | Bogdan Bogdanović (29) | Clint Capela (15) | Trae Young (16) | Gainbridge Fieldhouse; 14,212 | 38–37 |
| 76 | March 30 | @ Oklahoma City | W 136–118 | Trae Young (41) | Onyeka Okongwu (13) | Trae Young (8) | Paycom Center; 15,595 | 39–37 |
| 77 | March 31 | Cleveland | W 131–107 | Trae Young (30) | Clint Capela (14) | Trae Young (9) | State Farm Arena; 17,491 | 40–37 |

April: 3–2 (home: 2–0; road: 1–2)

| Game | Date | Team | Score | High points | High rebounds | High assists | Location Attendance | Record |
|---|---|---|---|---|---|---|---|---|
| 78 | April 2 | Brooklyn | W 122–115 | Trae Young (36) | Clint Capela (12) | Trae Young (10) | State Farm Arena; 18,126 | 41–37 |
| 79 | April 5 | @ Toronto | L 108–118 | Trae Young (26) | Clint Capela (14) | Trae Young (15) | Scotiabank Arena; 19,800 | 41–38 |
| 80 | April 6 | Washington | W 118–103 | Trae Young (30) | Danilo Gallinari (10) | Trae Young (11) | State Farm Arena; 17,381 | 42–38 |
| 81 | April 8 | @ Miami | L 109–113 | Trae Young (35) | Clint Capela (14) | Trae Young (8) | FTX Arena; 19,993 | 42–39 |
| 82 | April 10 | @ Houston | W 130–114 | Trae Young (28) | Clint Capela (13) | Trae Young (11) | Toyota Center; 18,055 | 43–39 |

2021–22 season schedule

=== Play-in ===
2021 preseason game log
Total: 2–0 (home: 1–0; road: 1–0)
Play-in: 2–0 (home: 1–0; road: 1–0)

| Game | Date | Team | Score | High points | High rebounds | High assists | Location Attendance | Record |
|---|---|---|---|---|---|---|---|---|
| 1 | April 13 | Charlotte | W 132–103 | Trae Young (24) | Clint Capela (17) | Trae Young (10) | State Farm Arena; 18,137 | 1–0 |
| 2 | April 15 | @ Cleveland | W 107–101 | Trae Young (38) | Onyeka Okongwu (9) | Trae Young (9) | Rocket Mortgage FieldHouse; 19,432 | 2–0 |

2021–22 season schedule

=== Playoffs ===
2022 playoff game log
Total: 1–4 (home: 1–1; road: 0–3)
First Round: 1–4 (home: 1–1; road: 0–3)

| Game | Date | Team | Score | High points | High rebounds | High assists | Location Attendance | Series |
|---|---|---|---|---|---|---|---|---|
| 1 | April 17 | @ Miami | L 91–115 | Danilo Gallinari (17) | Onyeka Okongwu (7) | Delon Wright (6) | FTX Arena; 19,514 | 0–1 |
| 2 | April 19 | @ Miami | L 105–115 | Bogdan Bogdanović (29) | John Collins (10) | Trae Young (7) | FTX Arena; 19,950 | 0–2 |
| 3 | April 22 | Miami | W 111–110 | Trae Young (24) | Bogdan Bogdanović (8) | Trae Young (8) | State Farm Arena; 18,421 | 1–2 |
| 4 | April 24 | Miami | L 86–110 | De'Andre Hunter (24) | Capela, Gallinari, Wright (7) | Trae Young (5) | State Farm Arena; 18,951 | 1–3 |
| 5 | April 26 | @ Miami | L 94–97 | De'Andre Hunter (35) | De'Andre Hunter (11) | Trae Young (6) | FTX Arena; 19,553 | 1–4 |

2021–22 season schedule

== Player statistics ==
Legend
| GP | Games played | GS | Games started | MPG | Minutes per game |
| FG% | Field-goal percentage | 3P% | 3-point field-goal percentage | FT% | Free-throw percentage |
| RPG | Rebounds per game | APG | Assists per game | SPG | Steals per game |
| BPG | Blocks per game | PPG | Points per game |

=== Regular season ===
| Player | GP | GS | MPG | FG% | 3P% | FT% | RPG | APG | SPG | BPG | PPG |
|---|---|---|---|---|---|---|---|---|---|---|---|
| Delon Wright | 77 | 8 | 18.9 | .454 | .379 | .857 | 2.9 | 2.4 | 1.2 | .2 | 4.4 |
| Trae Young | 76 | 76 | 34.9 | .460 | .382 | .904 | 3.7 | 9.7 | .9 | .1 | 28.4 |
| Clint Capela | 74 | 73 | 27.6 | .613 | .000 | .473 | 11.9 | 1.2 | .7 | 1.3 | 11.1 |
| Kevin Huerter | 74 | 60 | 29.6 | .454 | .389 | .808 | 3.4 | 2.7 | .7 | .4 | 12.1 |
| Danilo Gallinari | 66 | 18 | 25.3 | .434 | .381 | .904 | 4.7 | 1.5 | .4 | .2 | 11.7 |
| Bogdan Bogdanović | 63 | 27 | 29.3 | .431 | .368 | .843 | 4.0 | 3.1 | 1.1 | .2 | 15.1 |
| Lou Williams | 56 | 0 | 14.3 | .391 | .363 | .859 | 1.6 | 1.9 | .5 | .1 | 6.3 |
| John Collins | 54 | 53 | 30.8 | .526 | .364 | .793 | 7.8 | 1.8 | .6 | 1.0 | 16.2 |
| De'Andre Hunter | 53 | 52 | 29.8 | .442 | .379 | .765 | 3.3 | 1.3 | .7 | .4 | 13.4 |
| Timothé Luwawu-Cabarrot | 52 | 18 | 13.2 | .398 | .361 | .854 | 1.6 | .8 | .3 | .1 | 4.4 |
| Onyeka Okongwu | 48 | 6 | 20.7 | .690 | | .727 | 5.9 | 1.1 | .6 | 1.3 | 8.2 |
| Gorgui Dieng | 44 | 3 | 8.4 | .473 | .426 | .731 | 2.8 | .8 | .3 | .3 | 3.5 |
| Cam Reddish^{†} | 34 | 7 | 23.4 | .402 | .379 | .900 | 2.5 | 1.1 | 1.0 | .3 | 11.9 |
| Skylar Mays | 28 | 5 | 7.9 | .500 | .320 | .889 | .9 | .6 | .3 | .0 | 2.9 |
| Jalen Johnson | 22 | 0 | 5.5 | .537 | .231 | .714 | 1.2 | .1 | .1 | .1 | 2.4 |
| Kevin Knox II^{†} | 17 | 0 | 6.5 | .356 | .192 | .750 | 1.3 | .4 | .1 | .1 | 2.7 |
| Solomon Hill | 13 | 1 | 10.7 | .150 | .154 | | 1.8 | .9 | .3 | .2 | .6 |
| Sharife Cooper | 13 | 0 | 3.0 | .214 | .167 | | .4 | .4 | .0 | .0 | .5 |
| Lance Stephenson^{†} | 6 | 0 | 11.7 | .385 | .000 | .500 | 2.5 | 1.8 | .0 | .0 | 1.8 |
| Chaundee Brown Jr.^{†} | 3 | 2 | 27.7 | .360 | .400 | .833 | 4.7 | 1.3 | .7 | .0 | 9.7 |
| Wes Iwundu | 3 | 1 | 27.3 | .444 | .600 | .750 | 4.3 | .0 | .3 | .0 | 7.3 |
| Malcolm Hill^{†} | 3 | 0 | 15.3 | .625 | .600 | 1.000 | 2.0 | .3 | 1.3 | .3 | 5.7 |
| Cat Barber | 3 | 0 | 4.3 | .000 | | .000 | 1.0 | 1.0 | .0 | .0 | .0 |
| Cameron Oliver | 2 | 0 | 21.5 | .667 | .333 | .667 | 3.0 | 1.5 | .5 | .5 | 11.5 |

=== Playoffs ===
| Player | GP | GS | MPG | FG% | 3P% | FT% | RPG | APG | SPG | BPG | PPG |
|---|---|---|---|---|---|---|---|---|---|---|---|
| Trae Young | 5 | 5 | 37.2 | .319 | .184 | .788 | 5.0 | 6.0 | .6 | .0 | 15.4 |
| De'Andre Hunter | 5 | 5 | 35.0 | .557 | .462 | .800 | 3.8 | .6 | .8 | .2 | 21.2 |
| Kevin Huerter | 5 | 5 | 30.8 | .362 | .290 | .750 | 3.0 | 3.8 | 1.2 | .6 | 9.2 |
| John Collins | 5 | 4 | 24.4 | .487 | .364 | .500 | 4.6 | 1.2 | .4 | .2 | 9.4 |
| Danilo Gallinari | 5 | 3 | 22.4 | .400 | .267 | 1.000 | 4.2 | .8 | .2 | .0 | 10.2 |
| Onyeka Okongwu | 5 | 1 | 21.6 | .563 | | .800 | 5.4 | .4 | .8 | .8 | 5.2 |
| Delon Wright | 5 | 0 | 27.4 | .517 | .385 | .667 | 4.8 | 2.8 | .8 | .2 | 8.2 |
| Bogdan Bogdanović | 4 | 0 | 26.8 | .408 | .346 | .800 | 4.8 | 3.0 | .3 | .3 | 14.3 |
| Timothé Luwawu-Cabarrot | 4 | 0 | 5.5 | .500 | .333 | | .8 | .5 | .0 | .0 | 1.3 |
| Clint Capela | 2 | 2 | 20.0 | .333 | | | 7.5 | .0 | .5 | .5 | 2.0 |
| Gorgui Dieng | 2 | 0 | 5.0 | .500 | .000 | 1.000 | 1.5 | .0 | .0 | .0 | 1.5 |
| Kevin Knox II | 2 | 0 | 4.5 | .636 | .600 | 1.000 | 1.0 | .0 | 1.0 | .0 | 11.0 |
| Skylar Mays | 2 | 0 | 4.5 | 1.000 | | | .5 | .5 | .5 | .0 | 1.0 |
| Jalen Johnson | 2 | 0 | 4.5 | .000 | .000 | | .0 | .0 | .0 | .0 | .0 |

- ^{†} Denotes player spent time with another team in the season. Stats reflect time with the Hawks only.

== Transactions ==
=== Trades ===
August 7, 2021
| August 7, 2021 | To Atlanta Hawks Delon Wright (from Sacramento) | To Boston Celtics Kris Dunn (from Atlanta); Bruno Fernando (from Atlanta); 2023 POR second-round pick (from Atlanta) |
| August 7, 2021 | To Sacramento Kings Tristan Thompson (from Boston) |

=== Free agents ===
==== Re-signed ====
| Player | Signed |
|---|---|
| Solomon Hill | August 5, 2021 |
| John Collins | August 6, 2021 |
| Lou Williams | August 6, 2021 |

==== Additions ====
| Player | Signed | Former team |
|---|---|---|
| Gorgui Dieng | August 9, 2021 | San Antonio Spurs |
| Johnny Hamilton | September 22, 2021 | Fenerbahçe Beko |
| A. J. Lawson | September 22, 2021 | South Carolina |
| Timothé Luwawu-Cabarrot | September 22, 2021 | Brooklyn Nets |
| Jahlil Okafor | September 22, 2021 | Brooklyn Nets |
| DaQuan Jeffries | October 7, 2021 | San Antonio Spurs |
| Ibi Watson | October 12, 2021 | Dayton |
| Malcolm Hill | December 22, 2021 | Birmingham Squadron |
| Lance Stephenson | December 22, 2021 | Grand Rapids Gold |
| Wes Iwundu | December 23, 2021 | Charlotte Hornets |
| Chaundee Brown Jr. | December 27, 2021 | Los Angeles Lakers |

==== Subtractions ====
| Player | Date | New team |
|---|---|---|
| Tony Snell | August 10, 2021 | Portland Trail Blazers |
| Brandon Goodwin | October 14, 2021 | New York Knicks |
