= Naji Marshall =

American basketball player (born 1998)

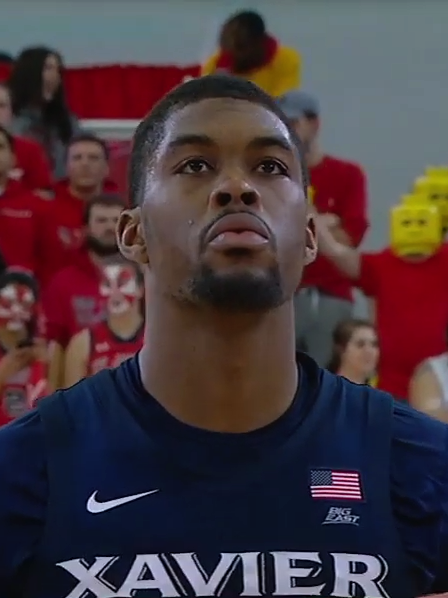
- Marshall with Xavier in 2019

No. 3 – Dallas Mavericks
- Position: Small forward
- League: NBA

Personal information
- Born: January 24, 1998 (age 28) Atlantic City, New Jersey, U.S.
- Listed height: 6 ft 6 in (1.98 m)
- Listed weight: 220 lb (100 kg)

Career information
- High school: Takoma Academy (Takoma Park, Maryland); Eleanor Roosevelt (Greenbelt, Maryland); Hargrave Military Academy (Chatham, Virginia)
- College: Xavier (2017–2020)
- NBA draft: 2020: undrafted
- Playing career: 2020–present

Career history
- 2020–2024: New Orleans Pelicans
- 2021: →Erie BayHawks
- 2022: →Birmingham Squadron
- 2024–present: Dallas Mavericks

Career highlights
- First-team All-Big East (2020); Second-team All-Big East (2019); Big East All-Freshman Team (2018)
- Stats at NBA.com
- Stats at Basketball Reference

Naji Maurice Marshall (/ˈnɑːʒi/ NAH-zhee; born January 24, 1998) is an American professional basketball player for the Dallas Mavericks of the National Basketball Association (NBA). He played college basketball for the Xavier Musketeers. After going undrafted in the 2020 NBA draft, Marshall signed with the New Orleans Pelicans. He played for the Pelicans for four years before signing with the Mavericks as a free agent in 2024.

== Early life ==
Marshall was born in Atlantic City, New Jersey but moved to Maryland at the age of 9. He is the son of Maurice Marshall, who was a professional boxer and is now a basketball coach at an elementary school, and Rayna Whitted, who works at Providence Hospital in Washington, D.C. His name means "strong warrior" in Arabic and was a nickname of his father's. Marshall has five brothers and one sister and grew up playing football and basketball. In middle school, he played in Atlantic City's Triple-B summer youth league.

He played his first season of high school basketball at Takoma Academy. As a sophomore, he transferred to Eleanor Roosevelt High School to play under coach Brendan O'Connell but was academically ineligible his first year. As a senior, Marshall averaged 17 points, nine rebounds, four assists and two steals per game. He led Eleanor Roosevelt to a 23–3 record and scored 27 points to lead the Raiders past Perry Hall High School 69–59, in the Maryland 4A state semifinals. He decided to attend the Hargrave Military Academy as a postgraduate student to improve his academics. Marshall averaged 20.7 points and 11.4 rebounds per game at Hargrave Military Academy. He competed for DC Premier on the Amateur Athletic Union (AAU) circuit. Marshall received scholarship offers from Pittsburgh, South Carolina, and Virginia Tech, but committed to playing college basketball for Xavier because he liked the culture. He was considered to be a four-star prospect by three recruiting sites, and ESPN ranked him as the 20th best small forward in his class.

== College career ==
Marshall contributed 12 points and four rebounds in his collegiate opening game against Morehead State. He scored a season-high 21 points in a 89–77 win over Georgetown on February 21, 2018. Marshall was named to the Big East All-Freshman team. As a freshman, Marshall averaged 7.7 points and 4.4 rebounds per game and made 18 starts. In the summer before his sophomore season, Marshall worked on improving his jump shot and his conditioning.

Marshall earned his first Big East player of the week honors on December 31, 2018, after scoring 19 points, grabbing a career-high 14 rebounds, and dished out four assists in a 74–65 win against DePaul. After scoring 28 points in a win at Seton Hall on February 20, 2019, and recording 17 points in a win over Villanova on February 24, Marshall was again named Big East player of the week. On February 28, Marshall scored a career-high 31 points as Xavier defeated St. John's 84–73. Marshall missed a game against St. John's with an ankle injury on March 9. He was named to the Second Team All-Big East by the coaches as a sophomore. Marshall averaged 14.7 points, 7.2 rebounds, and 3.4 assists per game, shooting 39.4 percent from the field and 27.7 percent from behind the arc. After the season, he declared for the 2019 NBA draft but withdrew his name and returned to Xavier.

Coming into his junior season, Marshall was named to the preseason First Team All-Big East and was on the watchlist for the Julius Erving Award. On December 7, Marshall tied his career-high of 31 points in a 73–66 win over Cincinnati in the Crosstown Shootout. He sat out a game against Western Carolina on December 18 with a stomach virus. On February 1, 2020, Marshall contributed 19 points, 10 rebounds and four assists in a 74–62 upset of tenth-ranked Seton Hall despite playing with the flu. Marshall hit the game-winning three-pointer with 4.5 seconds left in a 66–63 win at Georgetown on March 1, finishing with 20 points and 10 rebounds. At the conclusion of the regular season, Marshall was named to the First Team All-Big East. He averaged 16.8 points, 6.3 rebounds, and 4.0 assists per game. Following the season, Marshall declared for the 2020 NBA draft. On April 9, he announced he was signing with an agent, thus forgoing his remaining season of collegiate eligibility. Marshall scored 1,277 points in three seasons as a Musketeer.

== Professional career ==
=== New Orleans Pelicans (2020–2024) ===
After going unselected in the 2020 NBA draft, Marshall signed a two-way contract with the New Orleans Pelicans of the National Basketball Association (NBA) and their NBA G League affiliate, the Erie BayHawks on December 8, 2020. On January 15, 2021, Marshall made his NBA debut against the Los Angeles Lakers. He began receiving consistent minutes in April due to a rash of injuries to players. On May 7, 2021, the Pelicans signed him to a multi-year contract. In his rookie season, Marshall averaged 7.7 points and 4.6 rebounds per game for the Pelicans, shooting 39.2 percent from the field.

In January 2022, he and Trey Murphy III were assigned to the Pelicans' G League affiliate, the Birmingham Squadron.

=== Dallas Mavericks (2024–present) ===
On July 6, 2024, Marshall signed a three-year, $27 million contract with the Dallas Mavericks.

On December 28, 2024, Marshall was suspended for 4 games after an altercation with Jusuf Nurkić. On March 25, 2025, Marshall scored a career-high 38 points along with seven rebounds in a 128–113 loss to the New York Knicks.

On August 2, 2026, the Mavericks announced that they had re-signed Marshall to a multi-year contract extension but did not disclose the details. The same day, ESPN reported that Marshall had agreed to a three–year, $52 million extension.

== Career statistics ==
Legend
GP	Games played	GS	Games started	MPG	Minutes per game
FG%	Field goal percentage	3P%	3-point field goal percentage	FT%	Free throw percentage
RPG	Rebounds per game	APG	Assists per game	SPG	Steals per game
BPG	Blocks per game	PPG	Points per game	**Bold**	Career high

=== NBA ===
==== Regular season ====
Year	Team	GP	GS	MPG	FG%	3P%	FT%	RPG	APG	SPG	BPG	PPG
2020–21	New Orleans	32	10	21.9	.392	.349	.707	4.6	2.8	.8	**.3**	7.7
2021–22	New Orleans	55	4	13.4	.405	.200	.796	2.6	1.1	.6	.1	5.7
2022–23	New Orleans	**77**	21	23.3	.433	.303	.789	3.6	2.5	.7	.2	9.1
2023–24	New Orleans	66	1	19.0	.463	**.387**	.791	3.6	1.9	.7	.2	7.1
2024–25	Dallas	69	31	27.8	.508	.275	**.813**	**4.8**	3.0	1.0	.2	13.2
2025–26	Dallas	74	**47**	**29.5**	**.510**	.291	.760	4.7	**3.3**	**1.1**	.1	**15.2**
Career		373	114	23.0	.471	.300	.777	4.0	2.5	.8	.2	10.1

==== Playoffs ====
Year	Team	GP	GS	MPG	FG%	3P%	FT%	RPG	APG	SPG	BPG	PPG
2022	New Orleans	**6**	0	9.4	**.700**	—	**1.000**	1.0	.8	.2	.2	3.0
2024	New Orleans	4	0	**21.0**	.429	.400	**1.000**	**2.8**	**1.3**	**.5**	**.5**	**9.0**
Career		10	0	14.0	.500	.400	1.000	1.7	1.0	.3	.3	5.4

=== College ===
Year	Team	GP	GS	MPG	FG%	3P%	FT%	RPG	APG	SPG	BPG	PPG
2017–18	Xavier	**35**	18	21.8	**.530**	**.349**	**.753**	4.4	1.6	.7	.3	7.7
2018–19	Xavier	33	**33**	**35.9**	.394	.277	.722	**7.2**	3.4	1.1	.2	14.7
2019–20	Xavier	31	31	35.7	.445	.286	.710	6.3	**4.0**	**1.3**	**.4**	**16.8**
Career		99	82	30.9	.439	.289	.725	5.9	3.0	1.0	.3	12.9
