= Delon Wright =

American basketball player (born 1992)

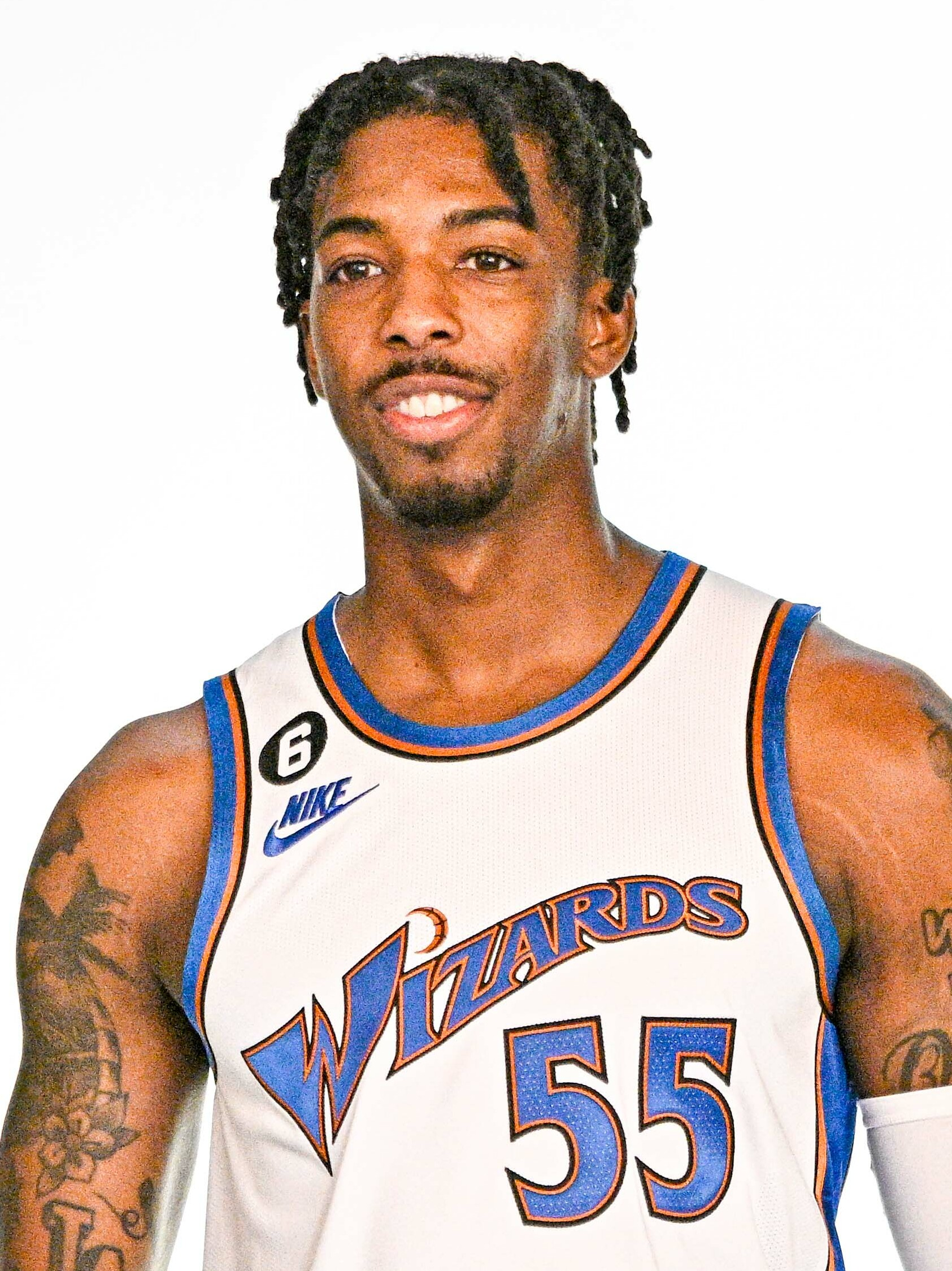
- Wright with the Washington Wizards in 2022

Free agent
- Position: Point guard / shooting guard

Personal information
- Born: April 26, 1992 (age 34) Los Angeles, California, U.S.
- Listed height: 6 ft 5 in (1.96 m)
- Listed weight: 185 lb (84 kg)

Career information
- High school: Leuzinger (Lawndale, California)
- College: CC of San Francisco (2011–2013); Utah (2013–2015)
- NBA draft: 2015: 1st round, 20th overall pick
- Drafted by: Toronto Raptors
- Playing career: 2015–present

Career history
- 2015–2019: Toronto Raptors
- 2015–2017: →Raptors 905
- 2019: Memphis Grizzlies
- 2019–2020: Dallas Mavericks
- 2020–2021: Detroit Pistons
- 2021: Sacramento Kings
- 2021–2022: Atlanta Hawks
- 2022–2024: Washington Wizards
- 2024: Miami Heat
- 2024–2025: Milwaukee Bucks
- 2025: New York Knicks

Career highlights
- NBA Cup champion (2024); Consensus second-team All-American (2015); Bob Cousy Award (2015); 2× First-team All-Pac-12 (2014, 2015); 2× Pac-12 All-Defensive team (2014, 2015)
- Stats at NBA.com
- Stats at Basketball Reference

Delon Reginald Wright (born April 26, 1992) is an American professional basketball player who last played for the New York Knicks of the National Basketball Association (NBA). He played college basketball for the CC of San Francisco Rams and the Utah Utes, being a first-team all-conference player in the Pac-12 in 2014 and 2015. He also earned the Bob Cousy Award in 2015.

== High school and junior college ==
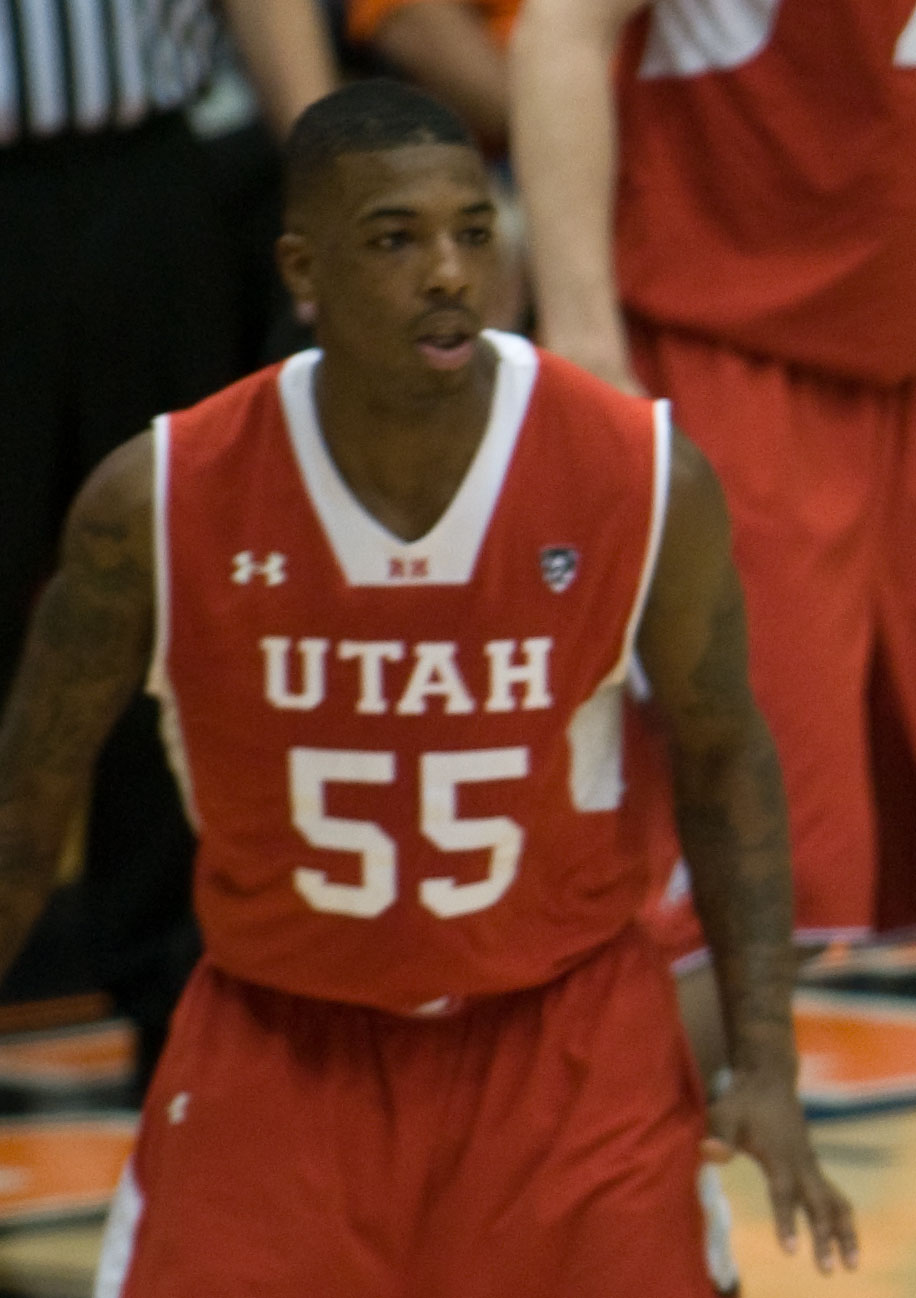
Wright in 2015 at Utah.

Born in Los Angeles, California, Wright led Leuzinger High School to the California state championship as a senior and was named CIF Southern Section Division 1A Player of the Year. Despite his athletic high school success, he struggled academically and failed to graduate, which led him to enroll at California Community College Athletic Association (CCCAA) school the City College of San Francisco, because California State law allowed him to attend without having finished high school yet. After two successful seasons there, he committed to Utah over Washington, Washington State, Gonzaga and Saint Mary's, despite the Utes winning only 6 games the previous season, where he majored in sociology.

== College career ==
In his first season at Utah, Wright immediately became one of the top players in the Pac-12 Conference. He finished in the top 10 in the conference in scoring (seventh at 16.9 points per game), assists (third at 4.89), steals (first at 2.56), blocked shots (sixth at 1.3), field goal percentage (third at 56.1 percent) and free throw percentage (ninth at 80.5 percent). Wright additionally averaged 6.8 rebounds per game, despite playing the guard position. At the conclusion of the 2013–14 season, Wright became the first Ute to be named first-team All-Pac-12 and was also named to the league's All-Defensive team. Following the season, Wright considered entering the 2014 NBA draft, but ultimately decided to return to Utah for his senior season.

At the start of his senior season, Wright was named to the 50-man watch lists for the Naismith College Player of the Year and the John R. Wooden Award. For the second-straight season, he was voted first-team All-Pac-12 and again named to the Pac-12 All-Defensive Team. Wright was also a two-time member of the Pac-12 All-Defensive team and won the 2015 Bob Cousy Award.

Wright became the first player in Utah men's basketball history to be named to the first-team All-Pac-12 in consecutive years (2014 and 2015).

== Professional career ==
=== Toronto Raptors (2015–2019) ===
On June 25, 2015, Wright was selected with the 20th overall pick in the 2015 NBA draft by the Toronto Raptors. On July 3, 2015, he signed his rookie scale contract with the Raptors and joined the team for the 2015 NBA Summer League. On April 8, 2016, with All-Stars DeMar DeRozan and Kyle Lowry rested, Wright scored a season-high 19 points in a 111–98 win over the Indiana Pacers. During his rookie season, he had multiple assignments with Raptors 905 of the NBA Development League.

Wright missed much of the 2016–17 season with a right shoulder injury. He also had multiple assignments to Raptors 905.

On January 3, 2018, Wright set career highs with 25 points and 13 rebounds in a 124–115 win over the Chicago Bulls. He had his first career double-double and hit four 3-pointers to lead the second unit.

Before the trade to the Grizzlies he averaged nearly 7 points per game during his last season with the Raptors.

=== Memphis Grizzlies (2019) ===
On February 7, 2019, Wright, C. J. Miles, Jonas Valančiūnas and a 2024 second-round draft pick were traded to the Memphis Grizzlies in exchange for Marc Gasol. On April 5, he scored a career-high 26 points in a 122–112 victory over the Dallas Mavericks. He also recorded his first career triple-double adding 14 assists and 10 rebounds. Two days later, on April 7, Wright posted his second triple-double with 20 points, 12 assists and 13 rebounds in a 129–127 victory over the Dallas Mavericks. On April 10, Wright posted his third triple-double with 13 points, 11 rebounds and 11 assists in a 132–117 win over the Golden State Warriors. He averaged 12.2 ppg with the Grizzlies.

=== Dallas Mavericks (2019–2020) ===
On July 8, 2019, Wright was acquired by the Dallas Mavericks in a sign-and-trade deal with the Memphis Grizzlies in exchange for two-second-round picks and the draft rights to Satnam Singh.

=== Detroit Pistons (2020–2021) ===
On November 27, 2020, Wright was traded to the Detroit Pistons in a three-team trade involving the Oklahoma City Thunder, who received Trevor Ariza from Detroit and two second round picks from Dallas. On January 25, 2021, Wright set a career high with 28 points in a 119–104 win over the Philadelphia 76ers.

=== Sacramento Kings (2021) ===
On March 25, 2021, Wright was traded to the Sacramento Kings in exchange for Cory Joseph and two future second-round draft picks.

=== Atlanta Hawks (2021–2022) ===
On August 7, 2021, Wright was traded to the Atlanta Hawks in a three-team trade with the Boston Celtics.

=== Washington Wizards (2022–2024) ===
On July 6, 2022, Wright signed a two-year, $16 million contract with the Washington Wizards. On March 24, 2023, Wright scored a season-high 24 points and grabbed seven rebounds during a 136–124 win over the San Antonio Spurs. On February 16, 2024, he was waived by the Wizards.

=== Miami Heat (2024) ===
On February 18, 2024, Wright signed with the Miami Heat.

=== Milwaukee Bucks (2024–2025) ===
On July 7, 2024, Wright signed with the Milwaukee Bucks. On December 17, 2024, Wright and the Bucks won the 2024 NBA Cup.

=== New York Knicks (2025) ===
On February 6, 2025, Wright was traded to the New York Knicks in a multi-team trade. In 14 appearances (five starts) for New York, Wright averaged 4.3 points, 1.4 rebounds, and 2.1 assists.

On September 27, 2025, Wright signed with the Indiana Pacers. On October 9, the Pacers waived Wright.

== Career statistics ==
Legend
GP	Games played	GS	Games started	MPG	Minutes per game
FG%	Field goal percentage	3P%	3-point field goal percentage	FT%	Free throw percentage
RPG	Rebounds per game	APG	Assists per game	SPG	Steals per game
BPG	Blocks per game	PPG	Points per game	**Bold**	Career high

=== NBA ===
==== Regular season ====
Year	Team	GP	GS	MPG	FG%	3P%	FT%	RPG	APG	SPG	BPG	PPG
2015–16	Toronto	27	1	8.5	.450	.385	.743	1.4	1.1	.3	.1	3.8
2016–17	Toronto	27	0	16.5	.422	.333	.764	1.8	2.1	1.0	.4	5.6
2017–18	Toronto	69	4	20.8	.465	.366	.829	2.9	2.9	1.0	.5	8.0
2018–19	Toronto	49	2	18.3	.433	.333	**.869**	2.6	2.2	.9	.3	6.9
2018–19	Memphis	26	11	**30.8**	.434	.256	.742	**5.4**	**5.3**	1.6	**.6**	**12.2**
2019–20	Dallas	73	5	21.5	.462	.370	.770	3.8	3.3	1.2	.3	6.9
2020–21	Detroit	36	**31**	29.2	.464	.348	.789	4.6	5.0	1.6	.5	10.4
2020–21	Sacramento	27	8	25.8	.462	**.398**	.833	3.9	3.6	1.6	.4	10.0
2021–22	Atlanta	**77**	8	18.9	.454	.379	.857	2.9	2.4	1.2	.2	4.4
2022–23	Washington	50	14	24.4	**.474**	.345	.867	3.6	3.9	**1.8**	.3	7.4
2023–24	Washington	33	0	13.8	.393	.368	.828	1.8	2.5	1.1	.2	4.1
2023–24	Miami	14	1	20.4	.394	.367	.813	1.9	2.6	1.4	.2	5.4
2024–25	Milwaukee	26	2	15.6	.268	.245	.563	1.8	1.8	.9	.3	2.5
2024–25	New York	14	5	16.4	.469	.333	.667	1.4	2.1	.9	.2	4.3
Career		548	92	20.4	.447	.348	.799	3.0	3.0	1.2	.3	6.7

==== Playoffs ====
Year	Team	GP	GS	MPG	FG%	3P%	FT%	RPG	APG	SPG	BPG	PPG
2016	Toronto	9	0	4.6	.300	.000	.615	.4	.3	.3	.0	1.6
2017	Toronto	9	0	10.2	.529	.333	.714	1.4	1.4	.4	.1	2.8
2018	Toronto	**10**	0	21.5	.456	.429	.938	2.2	2.3	**1.5**	**.9**	**8.6**
2020	Dallas	4	0	13.3	**.600**	.500	.600	0.8	1.8	1.3	.0	4.0
2022	Atlanta	5	0	**27.4**	.517	.385	.667	**4.8**	**2.8**	.8	.2	8.2
2024	Miami	4	**1**	26.8	**.600**	**.600**	**1.000**	3.0	1.8	1.0	.3	8.0
2025	New York	6	0	8.0	.222	.167	**1.000**	.3	.8	.5	.2	1.2
Career		47	1	14.7	.479	.407	.759	1.7	1.5	.8	.3	4.7

=== College ===
Year	Team	GP	GS	MPG	FG%	3P%	FT%	RPG	APG	SPG	BPG	PPG
2013–14	Utah	33	33	**36.4**	**.561**	.222	.793	**6.8**	**5.3**	**2.5**	**1.3**	**15.5**
2014–15	Utah	**35**	**35**	33.3	.509	**.356**	**.836**	4.9	5.1	2.1	1.0	14.5
Career		68	68	34.8	.535	.299	.814	5.8	5.2	2.3	1.1	15.0

== Personal life ==
Wright is the younger brother of former NBA player Dorell Wright.
