= 2021–22 New Orleans Pelicans season =

Professional basketball season

- Head coach: Willie Green
- General manager: Trajan Langdon
- Owners: Gayle Benson
- Arena: Smoothie King Center

Results
- Record: 36–46 (.439)
- Place: Division: 3rd (Southwest); Conference: 9th (Western)
- Playoff finish: First round (lost to Suns 2–4)
- Stats at Basketball Reference

Local media
- Television: Bally Sports New Orleans
- Radio: WWL-FM

The 2021–22 New Orleans Pelicans season was the 20th season of the New Orleans Pelicans franchise in the National Basketball Association (NBA). On June 16, 2021, coach Stan Van Gundy agreed to part ways with the Pelicans after one season. The Pelicans soon hired Willie Green as the next head coach.

On December 15, Devonte' Graham, who was acquired from the Charlotte Hornets in the offseason, hit an improbable 61–foot shot to hoist the Pelicans to a 113–110 win over the Oklahoma City Thunder. The shot set the NBA record for the longest buzzer–beating game–winner in league history, beating out Mahmoud Abdul-Rauf's 55–foot shot in 1992 for the Denver Nuggets, 109–106 victory over the Los Angeles Clippers.

Despite finishing the season with a 36–46 record and being 10 games under .500, the Pelicans managed to qualify for the play-in tournament after a win over the Sacramento Kings, followed by a Lakers loss to the Suns on April 5, 2022. They defeated both the San Antonio Spurs and the Los Angeles Clippers in the Play-In tournament to qualify for the playoffs for the first time since 2018, becoming the first team to qualify for the postseason with a 36–46 record since the Boston Celtics in 2004. They faced the top-seeded Phoenix Suns in the first round where they lost in six games.

== Draft ==
Round	Pick	Player	Position	Nationality	College / Club
1	10	Ziaire Williams	SF	United States	Stanford (Fr.)
2	35	Herbert Jones	SF	United States	Alabama (Sr.)
2	40	Jared Butler	SG	United States	Baylor (Jr.)
2	43	Greg Brown III	PF/SF	United States	Texas (Fr.)

The Pelicans entered the draft with one first-round pick and three second-round picks acquired via trade. They had swapped their original second-round pick with the Chicago Bulls as part of the Nikola Mirotić trade in 2018.

== Roster ==
2021–22 New Orleans Pelicans roster
Players

Pos.	No.	Player	Height	Weight	DOB	From
G	15	Jose Alvarado	6 ft 0 in (1.83 m)	179 lb (81 kg)	1998-04-12	Georgia Tech
F	12	Gary Clark (TW)	6 ft 6 in (1.98 m)	225 lb (102 kg)	1994-11-16	Cincinnati
G	4	Devonte' Graham	6 ft 1 in (1.85 m)	195 lb (88 kg)	1995-02-22	Kansas
G	2	Jared Harper (TW)	5 ft 10 in (1.78 m)	175 lb (79 kg)	1997-09-14	Auburn
F/C	10	Jaxson Hayes	7 ft 0 in (2.13 m)	220 lb (100 kg)	2000-05-23	Texas
C	9	Willy Hernangómez	6 ft 11 in (2.11 m)	250 lb (113 kg)	1994-05-27	Spain
F	14	Brandon Ingram	6 ft 8 in (2.03 m)	190 lb (86 kg)	1997-09-02	Duke
F	5	Herbert Jones	6 ft 7 in (2.01 m)	206 lb (93 kg)	1998-10-06	Alabama
G	13	Kira Lewis (injured)	6 ft 1 in (1.85 m)	170 lb (77 kg)	2001-04-06	Alabama
F	8	Naji Marshall	6 ft 7 in (2.01 m)	220 lb (100 kg)	1998-01-24	Xavier
G	3	CJ McCollum	6 ft 3 in (1.91 m)	190 lb (86 kg)	1991-09-19	Lehigh
F	25	Trey Murphy	6 ft 8 in (2.03 m)	206 lb (93 kg)	2000-06-18	Virginia
F	22	Larry Nance	6 ft 8 in (2.03 m)	245 lb (111 kg)	1993-01-01	Wyoming
G	21	Tony Snell	6 ft 6 in (1.98 m)	213 lb (97 kg)	1991-11-10	New Mexico
G	41	Garrett Temple	6 ft 5 in (1.96 m)	195 lb (88 kg)	1986-05-08	LSU
C	17	Jonas Valančiūnas	6 ft 11 in (2.11 m)	265 lb (120 kg)	1992-05-06	Lithuania
F	1	Zion Williamson (injured)	6 ft 7 in (2.01 m)	284 lb (129 kg)	2000-07-06	Duke

Coaches
Head coach
- Willie Green
Assistant(s)
- Jarron Collins
- Casey Hill
- Fred Vinson
- Teresa Weatherspoon

Legend
- (DP) Unsigned draft pick
- (FA) Free agent
- (S) Suspended
- (GL) On assignment to G League
- (TW) Two-way affiliate player
- Injured

Roster
Updated: March 29, 2022

=== Roster notes ===
- Power forward Zion Williamson missed the entire season due to foot and knee injuries.

== Standings ==
=== Division ===
Southwest Division	W	L	PCT	GB	Home	Road	Div	GP
y – Memphis Grizzlies	56	26	.683	–	30‍–‍11	26‍–‍15	11–5	82
x – Dallas Mavericks	52	30	.634	4.0	29‍–‍12	23‍–‍18	14–2	82
x – New Orleans Pelicans	36	46	.439	20.0	19‍–‍22	17‍–‍24	6–10	82
pi − San Antonio Spurs	34	48	.415	22.0	16‍–‍25	18‍–‍23	6–10	82
Houston Rockets	20	62	.244	36.0	11‍–‍30	9‍–‍32	3–13	82

=== Conference ===
Western Conference
#	Team	W	L	PCT	GB	GP
1	z – Phoenix Suns *	64	18	.780	–	82
2	y – Memphis Grizzlies *	56	26	.683	8.0	82
3	x – Golden State Warriors	53	29	.646	11.0	82
4	x – Dallas Mavericks	52	30	.634	12.0	82
5	y – Utah Jazz *	49	33	.598	15.0	82
6	x – Denver Nuggets	48	34	.585	16.0	82
7	x – Minnesota Timberwolves	46	36	.561	18.0	82
8	pi – Los Angeles Clippers	42	40	.512	22.0	82
9	x – New Orleans Pelicans	36	46	.439	28.0	82
10	pi − San Antonio Spurs	34	48	.415	30.0	82
11	Los Angeles Lakers	33	49	.402	31.0	82
12	Sacramento Kings	30	52	.366	34.0	82
13	Portland Trail Blazers	27	55	.329	37.0	82
14	Oklahoma City Thunder	24	58	.293	40.0	82
15	Houston Rockets	20	62	.244	44.0	82

== Game log ==
=== Preseason ===
2021 preseason game log
Total: 1–3 (home: 1–0; road: 0–3)
Preseason: 1–3 (home: 1–0; road: 0–3)

Game	Date	Team	Score	High points	High rebounds	High assists	Location Attendance	Record
1	October 4	@ Minnesota	L 114–117	Nickeil Alexander-Walker (22)	Hart, Marshall (7)	Tomáš Satoranský (4)	Target Center; 5,715	0–1
2	October 6	Orlando	W 104–86	Trey Murphy III (20)	Jonas Valančiūnas (9)	Devonte' Graham (7)	Smoothie King Center; 12,407	1–1
3	October 8	@ Chicago	L 85–121	Trey Murphy III (17)	Trey Murphy III (10)	Jonas Valančiūnas (3)	United Center; 13,909	1–2
4	October 11	@ Utah	L 96–127	Devonte' Graham (14)	Jonas Valančiūnas (6)	Lewis Jr., Murphy III (4)	Vivint Arena; 15,535	1–3

2020–21 season schedule

=== Regular season ===
2021–22 game log
Total: 36–46 (home: 19–22; road: 17–24)
October: 1–6 (home: 0–4; road: 1–2)

Game	Date	Team	Score	High points	High rebounds	High assists	Location Attendance	Record
1	October 20	Philadelphia	L 97–117	Brandon Ingram (25)	Jonas Valančiūnas (12)	Brandon Ingram (6)	Smoothie King Center; 12,845	0–1
2	October 22	@ Chicago	L 112–128	Brandon Ingram (26)	Ingram, Valančiūnas (8)	Brandon Ingram (8)	United Center; 20,996	0–2
2	October 23	@ Minnesota	L 89–96	Brandon Ingram (30)	Jonas Valančiūnas (17)	Brandon Ingram (4)	Target Center; 15,343	0–3
4	October 25	@ Minnesota	W 107–98	Brandon Ingram (27)	Jonas Valančiūnas (23)	Devonte' Graham (7)	Target Center; 14,435	1–3
5	October 27	Atlanta	L 99–102	Devonte' Graham (21)	Jonas Valančiūnas (15)	Ingram, Marshall (4)	Smoothie King Center; 15,541	1–4
6	October 29	Sacramento	L 109–113	Jonas Valančiūnas (24)	Jonas Valančiūnas (13)	Brandon Ingram (6)	Smoothie King Center; 17,507	1–5
7	October 30	New York	L 117–123	Jonas Valančiūnas (27)	Jonas Valančiūnas (14)	Devonte' Graham (8)	Smoothie King Center; 16,508	1–6

November: 5–11 (home: 3–3; road: 2–8)

Game	Date	Team	Score	High points	High rebounds	High assists	Location Attendance	Record
8	November 2	@ Phoenix	L 100–112	Jonas Valančiūnas (23)	Jonas Valančiūnas (14)	Devonte' Graham (6)	Footprint Center; 14,323	1–7
9	November 3	@ Sacramento	L 99–112	Alexander-Walker, Graham (16)	Jonas Valančiūnas (11)	Devonte' Graham (7)	Golden 1 Center; 12,480	1–8
10	November 5	@ Golden State	L 85–126	Jonas Valančiūnas (12)	Jonas Valančiūnas (15)	Satoranský, Valančiūnas (4)	Chase Center; 18,064	1–9
11	November 8	@ Dallas	L 92–108	Hart, Valančiūnas (22)	Jonas Valančiūnas (11)	Devonte' Graham (10)	American Airlines Center; 19,231	1–10
12	November 10	Oklahoma City	L 100–108	Nickeil Alexander-Walker (33)	Jonas Valančiūnas (15)	Garrett Temple (5)	Smoothie King Center; 15,355	1–11
13	November 12	Brooklyn	L 112–120	Jonas Valančiūnas (20)	Jonas Valančiūnas (12)	Graham, Satoransky (6)	Smoothie King Center; 14,650	1–12
14	November 13	Memphis	W 112–101	Nickeil Alexander-Walker (21)	Jonas Valančiūnas (9)	Jonas Valančiūnas (9)	Smoothie King Center; 14,358	2–12
15	November 15	@ Washington	L 100–105	Brandon Ingram (31)	Josh Hart (12)	Josh Hart (5)	Capital One Arena; 13,914	2–13
16	November 17	@ Miami	L 98–113	Nickeil Alexander-Walker (24)	Jonas Valančiūnas (8)	Brandon Ingram (5)	FTX Arena; 19,600	2–14
17	November 19	L.A. Clippers	W 94–81	Jonas Valančiūnas (26)	Jonas Valančiūnas (13)	Brandon Ingram (5)	Smoothie King Center; 15,274	3–14
18	November 20	@ Indiana	L 94–111	Jonas Valančiūnas (19)	Jonas Valančiūnas (13)	Alexander-Walker, Ingram (4)	Gainbridge Fieldhouse; 15,081	3–15
19	November 22	Minnesota	L 96–110	Willy Hernangómez (19)	Willy Hernangómez (11)	Kira Lewis Jr. (6)	Smoothie King Center; 15,689	3–16
20	November 24	Washington	W 127–102	Brandon Ingram (26)	Jonas Valančiūnas (11)	Alexander-Walker, Satoranský (5)	Smoothie King Center; 14,659	4–16
21	November 26	@ Utah	W 98–97	Brandon Ingram (21)	Jonas Valančiūnas (10)	Hart, Hernangómez, Ingram (5)	Vivint Arena; 18,306	5–16
22	November 27	@ Utah	L 105–127	Jaxson Hayes (15)	Jonas Valančiūnas (12)	Jose Alvarado (5)	Vivint Arena; 18,306	5–17
23	November 29	@ L.A. Clippers	W 123–104	Jonas Valančiūnas (39)	Jonas Valančiūnas (15)	Josh Hart (12)	Staples Center; 15,691	6–17

December: 7–5 (home: 4–2; road: 3–3)

Game	Date	Team	Score	High points	High rebounds	High assists	Location Attendance	Record
24	December 1	Dallas	L 107–139	Brandon Ingram (29)	Hernangómez, Valančiūnas (5)	Devonte' Graham (6)	Smoothie King Center; 15,558	6–18
25	December 3	@ Dallas	W 107–91	Brandon Ingram (24)	Willy Hernangómez (14)	Brandon Ingram (12)	American Airlines Center; 19,218	7–18
26	December 5	@ Houston	L 108–118	Brandon Ingram (40)	Willy Hernangómez (14)	Nickeil Alexander-Walker (5)	Toyota Center; 14,771	7–19
27	December 8	Denver	L 114–120 (OT)	Jonas Valančiūnas (27)	Jonas Valančiūnas (11)	Josh Hart (8)	Smoothie King Center; 15,035	7–20
28	December 10	Detroit	W 109–93	Brandon Ingram (26)	Josh Hart (13)	Hart, Ingram (5)	Smoothie King Center; 15,828	8–20
29	December 12	@ San Antonio	L 97–112	Brandon Ingram (27)	Jonas Valančiūnas (12)	Brandon Ingram (9)	AT&T Center; 14,990	8–21
30	December 15	@ Oklahoma City	W 113–110	Brandon Ingram (34)	Jonas Valančiūnas (16)	Devonte' Graham (8)	Paycom Center; 13,253	9–21
31	December 17	Milwaukee	W 116–112 (OT)	Devonte' Graham (26)	Josh Hart (15)	Josh Hart (8)	Smoothie King Center; 15,504	10–21
-	December 19	@ Philadelphia	Postponed (Makeup date: January 25)					
32	December 21	Portland	W 111–97	Brandon Ingram (28)	Jonas Valančiūnas (16)	Brandon Ingram (8)	Smoothie King Center; 15,272	11–21
33	December 23	@ Orlando	W 110–104	Brandon Ingram (31)	Willy Hernangómez (16)	Devonte' Graham (6)	Amway Center; 13,954	12–21
34	December 26	@ Oklahoma City	L 112–117	Josh Hart (29)	Josh Hart (10)	Devonte' Graham (8)	Paycom Center; 15,608	12–22
35	December 28	Cleveland	W 108–104	Herbert Jones (26)	Jonas Valančiūnas (10)	Graham, Satoranský (5)	Smoothie King Center; 15,835	13–22

January: 5–10 (home: 4–4; road: 1–6)

Game	Date	Team	Score	High points	High rebounds	High assists	Location Attendance	Record
36	January 1	@ Milwaukee	L 113–136	Jaxson Hayes (23)	Josh Hart (11)	Josh Hart (9)	Fiserv Forum; 17,341	13–23
37	January 3	Utah	L 104–115	Jonas Valančiūnas (25)	Hart, Valančiūnas (9)	Brandon Ingram (7)	Smoothie King Center; 15,057	13–24
38	January 4	Phoenix	L 110–123	Devonte' Graham (28)	Jonas Valančiūnas (16)	Devonte' Graham (6)	Smoothie King Center; 15,158	13–25
39	January 6	Golden State	W 101–96	Brandon Ingram (32)	Brandon Ingram (11)	Brandon Ingram (6)	Smoothie King Center; 15,986	14–25
40	January 9	@ Toronto	L 101–105	Brandon Ingram (22)	Jonas Valančiūnas (17)	Garrett Temple (6)	Scotiabank Arena; 0	14–26
41	January 11	Minnesota	W 128–125	Brandon Ingram (33)	Jonas Valančiūnas (12)	Brandon Ingram (9)	Smoothie King Center; 15,155	15–26
42	January 13	L.A. Clippers	W 113–89	Brandon Ingram (24)	Jonas Valančiūnas (16)	Devonte' Graham (7)	Smoothie King Center; 15,406	16–26
43	January 15	@ Brooklyn	L 105–120	Brandon Ingram (22)	Josh Hart (11)	Brandon Ingram (8)	Barclays Center; 17,034	16–27
44	January 17	@ Boston	L 92–104	Jonas Valančiūnas (22)	Jonas Valančiūnas (14)	Brandon Ingram (6)	TD Garden; 19,156	16–28
45	January 20	@ New York	W 102–91	Jonas Valančiūnas (18)	Jonas Valančiūnas (10)	Brandon Ingram (6)	Madison Square Garden; 16,168	17–28
46	January 24	Indiana	W 117–113	Devonte' Graham (25)	Jonas Valančiūnas (12)	Alexander-Walker, Graham, Valančiūnas (6)	Smoothie King Center; 15,581	18–28
47	January 25	@ Philadelphia	L 107–117	Nickeil Alexander-Walker (31)	Willy Hernangómez (10)	Alexander-Walker, Alvarado, Satoranský (6)	Wells Fargo Center; 20,121	18–29
48	January 28	Denver	L 105–116	Herbert Jones (19)	Willy Hernangómez (16)	Devonte' Graham (5)	Smoothie King Center; 15,254	18–30
49	January 29	Boston	L 97–107	Jose Alvarado (19)	Josh Hart (13)	Nickeil Alexander-Walker (5)	Smoothie King Center; 16,168	18–31
50	January 31	Cleveland	L 90–93	Devonte' Graham (20)	Hart, Hernangómez (10)	Nickeil Alexander-Walker (5)	Rocket Mortgage FieldHouse; 17,637	18–32

February: 7–4 (home: 2–4; road: 5–0)

Game	Date	Team	Score	High points	High rebounds	High assists	Location Attendance	Record
51	February 1	@ Detroit	W 111–101	Brandon Ingram (26)	Jonas Valančiūnas (13)	Jose Alvarado (6)	Little Caesars Arena; 15,499	19–32
52	February 4	@ Denver	W 113–105	Herbert Jones (25)	Jaxson Hayes (11)	Brandon Ingram (12)	Ball Arena; 16,152	20–32
53	February 6	@ Houston	W 120–107	Brandon Ingram (33)	Hart, Hayes (7)	Brandon Ingram (12)	Toyota Center; 15,702	21–32
54	February 8	Houston	W 110–97	Brandon Ingram (26)	Herbert Jones (11)	Devonte' Graham (8)	Smoothie King Center; 15,121	22–32
55	February 10	Miami	L 97–112	Jose Alvarado (17)	Valančiūnas, Clark (9)	CJ McCollum (5)	Smoothie King Center; 16,672	22–33
56	February 12	San Antonio	L 114–124	CJ McCollum (36)	Jonas Valančiūnas (12)	Graham, McCollum (5)	Smoothie King Center; 16,615	22–34
57	February 14	Toronto	W 120–90	CJ McCollum (23)	Brandon Ingram (11)	Brandon Ingram (8)	Smoothie King Center; 15,319	23–34
58	February 15	Memphis	L 109–121	CJ McCollum (30)	CJ McCollum (6)	CJ McCollum (7)	Smoothie King Center; 15,901	23–35
59	February 17	Dallas	L 118–125	CJ McCollum (38)	Jonas Valančiūnas (18)	Brandon Ingram (8)	Smoothie King Center; 15,906	23–36
60	February 25	@ Phoenix	W 117–102	CJ McCollum (32)	Jonas Valančiūnas (17)	Brandon Ingram (7)	Footprint Center; 17,071	24–36
61	February 28	@ L.A. Lakers	W 123–95	CJ McCollum (22)	Jonas Valančiūnas (10)	Ingram, McCollum (10)	Crypto.com Arena; 17,536	25–36

March: 8–7 (home: 5–4; road: 3–3)

Game	Date	Team	Score	High points	High rebounds	High assists	Location Attendance	Record
62	March 2	Sacramento	W 125–95	Brandon Ingram (33)	Jonas Valančiūnas (14)	CJ McCollum (9)	Smoothie King Center; 15,490	26–36
63	March 4	Utah	W 124–90	Brandon Ingram (29)	Hernangómez, Ingram (8)	Brandon Ingram (6)	Smoothie King Center; 16,178	27–36
64	March 6	@ Denver	L 130–138 (OT)	Brandon Ingram (38)	Jonas Valančiūnas (14)	Ingram, McCollum (9)	Ball Arena; 14,962	27–37
65	March 8	@ Memphis	L 111–132	CJ McCollum (32)	Willy Hernangómez (9)	CJ McCollum (11)	FedEx Forum; 16,433	27–38
66	March 9	Orlando	L 102–108	CJ McCollum (32)	Jonas Valančiūnas (15)	CJ McCollum (8)	Smoothie King Center; 15,633	27–39
67	March 11	Charlotte	L 120–142	Trey Murphy III (32)	Trey Murphy III (9)	Herbert Jones (8)	Smoothie King Center; 16,838	27–40
68	March 13	Houston	W 130–105	Jonas Valančiūnas (32)	Marshall, Valančiūnas (10)	Jose Alvarado (10)	Smoothie King Center; 15,683	28–40
69	March 15	Phoenix	L 115–131	Herbert Jones (22)	Jonas Valančiūnas (12)	CJ McCollum (9)	Smoothie King Center; 16,789	28–41
70	March 18	@ San Antonio	W 124–91	CJ McCollum (20)	Jonas Valančiūnas (12)	Jose Alvarado (5)	AT&T Center; 18,354	29–41
71	March 20	@ Atlanta	W 117–112	Jonas Valančiūnas (26)	Hayes, Valančiūnas (12)	CJ McCollum (8)	State Farm Arena; 17,123	30–41
72	March 21	@ Charlotte	L 103–106	CJ McCollum (27)	Jonas Valančiūnas (18)	CJ McCollum (6)	Spectrum Center; 13,351	30–42
73	March 24	Chicago	W 126–109	Devonte' Graham (30)	Jonas Valančiūnas (19)	Jose Alvarado (7)	Smoothie King Center; 13,973	31–42
74	March 26	San Antonio	L 103–107	CJ McCollum (32)	Jonas Valančiūnas (11)	Jonas Valančiūnas (6)	Smoothie King Center; 13,097	31–43
75	March 27	L.A. Lakers	W 116–108	Brandon Ingram (26)	Jonas Valančiūnas (12)	CJ McCollum (6)	Smoothie King Center; 18,516	32–43
76	March 30	@ Portland	W 117–107	CJ McCollum (25)	Jonas Valančiūnas (11)	Brandon Ingram (6)	Moda Center; 18,551	33–43

April: 3–4 (home: 1–2; road: 2–2)

Game	Date	Team	Score	High points	High rebounds	High assists	Location Attendance	Record
77	April 1	@ L.A. Lakers	W 114–111	CJ McCollum (32)	Jonas Valančiūnas (12)	Brandon Ingram (7)	Crypto.com Arena; 18,997	34–43
78	April 3	@ L.A. Clippers	L 100–119	CJ McCollum (19)	Jaxson Hayes (10)	Ingram, McCollum (4)	Crypto.com Arena; 19,068	34–44
79	April 5	@ Sacramento	W 123–109	Hayes, McCollum (23)	Hayes, Hernangómez (12)	Brandon Ingram (8)	Golden 1 Center; 16,047	35–44
80	April 7	Portland	W 127–94	CJ McCollum (23)	Willy Hernangómez (14)	Jose Alvarado (7)	Smoothie King Center; 12,432	36–44
81	April 9	@ Memphis	L 114–141	CJ McCollum (16)	Willy Hernangómez (10)	Jose Alvarado (5)	FedEx Forum; 17,207	36–45
82	April 10	Golden State	L 107–128	Naji Marshall (19)	Willy Hernangómez (9)	Jared Harper (9)	Smoothie King Center; 16,595	36–46

2021–22 season schedule

=== Play-in ===
2022 play-in game log
Total: 2–0 (home: 1–0; road: 1–0)
Play-in: 2–0 (home: 1–0; road: 1–0)

Game	Date	Team	Score	High points	High rebounds	High assists	Location Attendance	Record
1	April 13	San Antonio	W 113–103	CJ McCollum (32)	Jonas Valančiūnas (14)	CJ McCollum (7)	Smoothie King Center; 18,610	1–0
2	April 15	@ L.A. Clippers	W 105–101	Brandon Ingram (30)	Larry Nance Jr. (16)	Brandon Ingram (6)	Crypto.com Arena; 19,068	2–0

2021–22 season schedule

== Playoffs ==
=== Game log ===
2022 playoff game log
Total: 2–4 (home: 1–2; road: 1–2
First Round: 2–4 (home: 1–2; road: 1–2)

Game	Date	Team	Score	High points	High rebounds	High assists	Location Attendance	Series
1	April 17	@ Phoenix	L 99–110	CJ McCollum (25)	Jonas Valančiūnas (25)	CJ McCollum (6)	Footprint Center; 17,071	0–1
2	April 19	@ Phoenix	W 125–114	Brandon Ingram (37)	Jonas Valančiūnas (13)	Ingram, McCollum (9)	Footprint Center; 17,071	1–1
3	April 22	Phoenix	L 111–114	Brandon Ingram (34)	Jonas Valančiūnas (11)	Ingram, McCollum (7)	Smoothie King Center; 18,962	1–2
4	April 24	Phoenix	W 118–103	Brandon Ingram (30)	Jonas Valančiūnas (15)	Brandon Ingram (5)	Smoothie King Center; 18,962	2–2
5	April 26	@ Phoenix	L 97–112	Brandon Ingram (22)	Jonas Valančiūnas (14)	Ingram, McCollum (5)	Footprint Center; 17,071	2–3
6	April 28	Phoenix	L 109–115	Brandon Ingram (21)	Nance, Valančiūnas (8)	Brandon Ingram (11)	Smoothie King Center; 18,710	2–4

2022 playoff schedule

== Player statistics ==
Legend
GP	Games played	GS	Games started	MPG	Minutes per game
FG%	Field-goal percentage	3P%	3-point field-goal percentage	FT%	Free-throw percentage
RPG	Rebounds per game	APG	Assists per game	SPG	Steals per game
BPG	Blocks per game	PPG	Points per game

=== Regular season ===
New Orleans Pelicans statistics
Player	GP	GS	MPG	FG%	3P%	FT%	RPG	APG	SPG	BPG	PPG
Herbert Jones	78	69	29.9	.476	.337	.840	3.8	2.1	1.7	.8	9.5
Devonte' Graham	76	63	28.4	.363	.341	.843	2.3	4.2	.9	.2	11.9
Jonas Valančiūnas	74	74	30.3	.544	.361	.820	11.4	2.6	.6	.8	17.8
Jaxson Hayes	70	28	20.0	.616	.351	.766	4.5	.6	.5	.8	9.3
Trey Murphy III	62	1	13.9	.394	.382	.882	2.4	.6	.4	.1	5.4
Garrett Temple	59	16	18.6	.376	.319	.683	2.4	1.3	.7	.4	5.2
Brandon Ingram	55	55	34.0	.461	.327	.826	5.8	5.6	.6	.5	22.7
Naji Marshall	55	4	13.4	.405	.200	.796	2.6	1.1	.6	.1	5.7
Jose Alvarado	54	1	15.4	.446	.291	.679	1.9	2.8	1.3	.1	6.1
Nickeil Alexander-Walker^{†}	50	19	26.3	.375	.311	.722	3.3	2.8	.8	.4	12.8
Willy Hernangómez	50	8	16.8	.520	.333	.773	6.8	1.3	.4	.4	9.1
Josh Hart^{†}	41	40	33.5	.505	.323	.753	7.8	4.1	1.1	.3	13.4
Gary Clark	38	1	9.9	.375	.400	.700	2.4	.5	.3	.2	2.7
Tomáš Satoranský^{†}	32	3	15.0	.299	.161	.760	2.0	2.4	.4	.0	2.8
CJ McCollum^{†}	26	26	33.8	.493	.394	.667	4.5	5.8	1.3	.0	24.3
Kira Lewis Jr.	24	0	14.2	.404	.224	.833	1.6	2.0	.5	.0	5.9
Tony Snell^{†}	15	2	18.5	.446	.396	1.000	2.1	.5	.5	.1	5.9
Larry Nance Jr.^{†}	9	0	20.2	.551	.500	1.000	4.3	.9	.6	.8	7.3
Tyrone Wallace	6	0	12.5	.350	.250	.200	1.3	.2	.5	.2	2.8
Jared Harper	5	0	8.6	.538	.417	1.000	.4	2.8	.8	.2	7.4
Alize Johnson^{†}	4	0	7.0	.300		.750	3.3	.3	.5	.0	2.3
Didi Louzada^{†}	2	0	3.5	.000	.000		1.0	.5	.0	.0	.0

=== Playoffs ===
New Orleans Pelicans statistics
Player	GP	GS	MPG	FG%	3P%	FT%	RPG	APG	SPG	BPG	PPG
Brandon Ingram	6	6	39.3	.475	.407	.830	6.2	6.2	.7	.3	27.0
CJ McCollum	6	6	39.0	.392	.333	.692	6.7	4.8	.7	.8	22.2
Herbert Jones	6	6	37.7	.477	.417	.773	3.3	1.8	1.8	.8	10.7
Jonas Valančiūnas	6	6	29.2	.485	.167	.769	14.3	3.0	.7	.2	14.5
Jaxson Hayes	6	6	13.8	.560	.000	.636	2.5	.2	.0	.3	5.8
Larry Nance Jr.	6	0	21.7	.564	.222	.818	5.8	1.8	.5	.3	9.2
Trey Murphy III	6	0	20.0	.409	.474	.800	2.5	.5	.5	.2	5.2
Jose Alvarado	6	0	19.5	.485	.375	.769	1.3	1.5	1.2	.2	8.0
Devonte' Graham	6	0	10.0	.333	.357	.875	1.5	.7	.2	.2	4.0
Naji Marshall	6	0	9.3	.700		1.000	1.0	.8	.2	.2	3.0
Willy Hernangómez	1	0	2.0	.250	.000		2.0	.0	.0	.0	2.0
Garrett Temple	1	0	2.0				1.0	.0	.0	.0	.0

- ^{†} Denotes player spent time with another team in the season. Stats reflect time with the Pelicans only.

== Transactions ==
=== Trades ===
July 29, 2021	To New Orleans Pelicans Cash considerations	To Philadelphia 76ers 2021 No. 53 pick
