= Zach Zarba =

American basketball referee (born 1975)

- Born: Zachary Zarba; April 29, 1975 (age 50); New York City, U.S.
- Education: State University of New York at New Paltz
- Occupation: NBA referee

Zachary Zarba (born April 28, 1975) is an American professional basketball referee in the National Basketball Association. He wore uniform number 58 until the 2012–2013 season, when he changed to 28, and currently wears uniform number 15. Zach has officiated 1,182 regular-season games in 19 seasons as an NBA staff official, beginning in 2004. He has also refereed 133 playoff games, including 11 NBA Finals games. Other assignments have included the 2016 NBA All-Star Game in Toronto.

== Biography ==
Zarba was born in Brooklyn, New York, where he attended local public schools, graduating from Midwood High School. Prior to joining the NBA, Zarba officiated in the NBA Development League (now the NBA G League) for two years, where he was part of the crew that officiated the 2003 D-League Finals. He also spent one year officiating in the CBA and two years officiating in the IBL.

Zarba has three years of collegiate officiating experience in the ACC, SEC, Colonial, ASUN, OVC and NEC Conferences. In addition, he has three years of high school officiating experience in New York.

While at New Paltz, Zarba was a member of the basketball team and was named captain his senior season. He graduated with a degree in Political Science. He currently does public and community service work for EBC High School in Bushwick, Brooklyn.

== Personal life ==
Zarba has two children with his wife, Christiane.

== See also ==
- List of NBA referees
