= 2023–24 Miami Heat season =

- Head coach: Erik Spoelstra
- President: Pat Riley
- General manager: Andy Elisburg
- Owner: Micky Arison
- Arena: Kaseya Center

Results
- Record: 46–36 (.561)
- Place: Division: 2nd (Southeast); Conference: 8th (Eastern)
- Playoff finish: First round (lost to Celtics 1–4)
- Stats at Basketball Reference

Local media
- Television: Bally Sports Sun
- Radio: WQAM

The 2023–24 Miami Heat season was the 36th season for the franchise in the National Basketball Association (NBA). The Heat entered the season as the defending Eastern Conference champions and league runners-up after losing to the Denver Nuggets in the previous season's NBA Finals in five games. This was the first season since 2002–03 without Udonis Haslem on the team's roster, as he retired from the NBA after 20 years the previous season. They slightly improved upon their record from the previous year.

Finishing eighth in the Eastern Conference, the Heat clinched the eighth seed in the playoffs for the second straight year through the play-in tournament, losing to the 7th-seeded Philadelphia 76ers and defeating the 9th-seeded Chicago Bulls. The team attempted to qualify for back-to-back Finals appearances for the first time since 2013 and 2014, but the Heat entered the playoffs without leading scorers Jimmy Butler and Terry Rozier, who were sidelined due to injuries at the end of the season. In the first round, the Heat were eliminated by the eventual NBA champion Boston Celtics in five games.

The Miami Heat drew an average home attendance of 19,749 in 41 home games in the 2023-24 NBA season.

== Draft ==
Round	Pick	Player	Position(s)	Nationality	College / Club
1	18	Jaime Jaquez Jr.	SF/SG	United States	UCLA (Sr.)

The Heat held the 18th overall pick in the 2023 NBA draft. The team traded their second-round pick, along with Josh McRoberts, to the Dallas Mavericks in 2017 as part of a deal to acquire A. J. Hammons.

== Roster ==
2023–24 Miami Heat roster
Players

Pos.	No.	Player	Height	Weight	DOB	From
F/C	13	Bam Adebayo	6 ft 9 in (2.06 m)	255 lb (116 kg)	1997-07-18	Kentucky
F/C	31	Thomas Bryant	6 ft 10 in (2.08 m)	248 lb (112 kg)	1997-07-31	Indiana
F	22	Jimmy Butler	6 ft 7 in (2.01 m)	230 lb (104 kg)	1989-09-14	Marquette
F	8	Jamal Cain (TW)	6 ft 7 in (2.01 m)	191 lb (87 kg)	1999-03-20	Oakland
G	14	Tyler Herro	6 ft 5 in (1.96 m)	195 lb (88 kg)	2000-01-20	Kentucky
F	24	Haywood Highsmith	6 ft 5 in (1.96 m)	220 lb (100 kg)	1996-12-09	Wheeling
G/F	11	Jaime Jr. Jaquez	6 ft 7 in (2.01 m)	225 lb (102 kg)	2001-02-18	UCLA
F	5	Nikola Jović	6 ft 10 in (2.08 m)	205 lb (93 kg)	2003-06-09	Serbia
F/C	42	Kevin Love	6 ft 8 in (2.03 m)	251 lb (114 kg)	1988-09-07	UCLA
F	16	Caleb Martin	6 ft 5 in (1.96 m)	205 lb (93 kg)	1995-09-28	Nevada
G	88	Patty Mills	6 ft 2 in (1.88 m)	180 lb (82 kg)	1988-08-11	Saint Mary's
G/F	0	Josh Richardson (injured)	6 ft 6 in (1.98 m)	200 lb (91 kg)	1993-09-15	Tennessee
G/F	55	Duncan Robinson	6 ft 7 in (2.01 m)	215 lb (98 kg)	1994-04-22	Michigan
F/C	25	Orlando Robinson	6 ft 10 in (2.08 m)	235 lb (107 kg)	2000-07-10	Fresno State
G	2	Terry Rozier	6 ft 1 in (1.85 m)	190 lb (86 kg)	1994-03-17	Louisville
F	21	Cole Swider (TW)	6 ft 9 in (2.06 m)	220 lb (100 kg)	1999-05-08	Syracuse
G	15	Alondes Williams (TW)	6 ft 4 in (1.93 m)	210 lb (95 kg)	1999-06-19	Wake Forest
G	4	Delon Wright	6 ft 5 in (1.96 m)	185 lb (84 kg)	1992-04-26	Utah

Coaches
Head coach
- Erik Spoelstra
Assistant(s)
- Malik Allen
- Caron Butler
- Octavio De La Grana
- Wayne Ellington
- Eric Glass
- Chris Quinn

Legend
- (DP) Unsigned draft pick
- (FA) Free agent
- (S) Suspended
- (GL) On assignment to G League affiliate
- (TW) Two-way affiliate player
- Injured

Roster
Updated: April 6, 2024

== Standings ==
=== Division ===
Southeast Division	W	L	PCT	GB	Home	Road	Div	GP
y – Orlando Magic	47	35	.573	–	29‍–‍12	18‍–‍23	9‍–‍7	82
x – Miami Heat	46	36	.561	1.0	22‍–‍19	24‍–‍17	13‍–‍3	82
pi – Atlanta Hawks	36	46	.439	11.0	21‍–‍20	15‍–‍26	8‍–‍8	82
Charlotte Hornets	21	61	.256	26.0	11‍–‍30	10‍–‍31	6‍–‍10	82
Washington Wizards	15	67	.183	32.0	7‍–‍34	8‍–‍33	4‍–‍12	82

=== Conference ===
Eastern Conference
#	Team	W	L	PCT	GB	GP
1	z – Boston Celtics *	64	18	.780	–	82
2	x – New York Knicks	50	32	.610	14.0	82
3	y – Milwaukee Bucks *	49	33	.598	15.0	82
4	x – Cleveland Cavaliers	48	34	.585	16.0	82
5	y – Orlando Magic *	47	35	.573	17.0	82
6	x – Indiana Pacers	47	35	.573	17.0	82
7	x – Philadelphia 76ers	47	35	.573	17.0	82
8	x – Miami Heat	46	36	.561	18.0	82
9	pi – Chicago Bulls	39	43	.476	25.0	82
10	pi – Atlanta Hawks	36	46	.439	28.0	82
11	Brooklyn Nets	32	50	.390	32.0	82
12	Toronto Raptors	25	57	.305	39.0	82
13	Charlotte Hornets	21	61	.256	43.0	82
14	Washington Wizards	15	67	.183	49.0	82
15	Detroit Pistons	14	68	.171	50.0	82

== Game log ==
=== Preseason ===
2023 preseason game log
Total: 2–3 (Home: 2–1; Road: 0–2)
Preseason: 2–3 (home: 2–1; road: 0–2)

Game	Date	Team	Score	High points	High rebounds	High assists	Location Attendance	Record
1	October 10	Charlotte	W 113–109	Tyler Herro (22)	Thomas Bryant (8)	Hampton, Herro, Richardson, Smith (3)	Kaseya Center; 19,600	1–0
2	October 13	@ San Antonio	L 104–120	Jamal Cain (24)	Justin Champagnie (11)	Duncan Robinson (5)	Frost Bank Center; 17,412	1–1
3	October 15	Memphis	W 132–124	Tyler Herro (30)	Cain, Love (7)	Kyle Lowry (9)	Kaseya Center; 19,600	2–1
4	October 18	Brooklyn	L 104–107	Highsmith, Swider (15)	Jamal Cain (14)	Dru Smith (10)	Kaseya Center; 19,600	2–2
5	October 20	@ Houston	L 104–110	R. J. Hampton (17)	Orlando Robinson (5)	Hampton, Smith (5)	Toyota Center; 18,055	2–3

2023–24 preseason schedule

=== Regular season ===
2023–24 game log
Total: 46–36 (Home: 22–19; Road: 24–17)
October: 1–3 (home: 1–0; road: 0–3)

Game	Date	Team	Score	High points	High rebounds	High assists	Location Attendance	Record
1	October 25	Detroit	W 103–102	Bam Adebayo (22)	Jimmy Butler (13)	Jimmy Butler (4)	Kaseya Center; 19,659	1–0
2	October 27	@ Boston	L 111–119	Tyler Herro (28)	Kevin Love (9)	Tyler Herro (6)	TD Garden; 19,156	1–1
3	October 28	@ Minnesota	L 90–106	Tyler Herro (22)	Nikola Jović (11)	Kyle Lowry (7)	Target Center; 18,024	1–2
4	October 30	@ Milwaukee	L 114–122	Tyler Herro (35)	Tyler Herro (8)	Orlando Robinson (7)	Fiserv Forum; 17,341	1–3

November: 10–5 (home: 4–2; road: 6–3)

Game	Date	Team	Score	High points	High rebounds	High assists	Location Attendance	Record
5	November 1	Brooklyn	L 105–109	Tyler Herro (30)	Bam Adebayo (14)	Tyler Herro (5)	Kaseya Center; 19,600	1–4
6	November 3	Washington	W 121–114	Tyler Herro (24)	Tyler Herro (10)	Tyler Herro (9)	Kaseya Center; 19,660	2–4
7	November 6	L.A. Lakers	W 108–107	Jimmy Butler (28)	Bam Adebayo (19)	Bam Adebayo (10)	Kaseya Center; 19,725	3–4
8	November 8	@ Memphis	W 108–102	Bam Adebayo (30)	Adebayo, Lowry (11)	Kyle Lowry (9)	FedExForum; 16,781	4–4
9	November 11	@ Atlanta	W 117–109	Bam Adebayo (26)	Bam Adebayo (17)	Haywood Highsmith (5)	State Farm Arena; 17,722	5–4
10	November 12	@ San Antonio	W 118–113	Duncan Robinson (26)	Bam Adebayo (11)	Bam Adebayo (6)	Frost Bank Center; 18,036	6–4
11	November 14	@ Charlotte	W 111–105	Jimmy Butler (32)	Bam Adebayo (11)	Josh Richardson (6)	Spectrum Center; 15,673	7–4
12	November 16	Brooklyn	W 122–115	Jimmy Butler (36)	Kevin Love (9)	Jaime Jaquez Jr. (5)	Kaseya Center; 19,866	8–4
13	November 18	@ Chicago	L 97–102	Jimmy Butler (25)	Bam Adebayo (10)	Duncan Robinson (7)	United Center; 18,063	8–5
14	November 20	@ Chicago	W 118–100	Bam Adebayo (23)	Bam Adebayo (11)	Adebayo, Butler, Lowry (6)	United Center; 19,258	9–5
15	November 22	@ Cleveland	W 129–96	Kyle Lowry (28)	Orlando Robinson (9)	Jimmy Butler (9)	Rocket Mortgage FieldHouse	10–5
16	November 24	@ New York	L 98–100	Jimmy Butler (23)	Bam Adebayo (12)	Jaime Jaquez Jr. (4)	Madison Square Garden; 19,812	10–6
17	November 25	@ Brooklyn	L 97–112	Caleb Martin (22)	Kevin Love (10)	Jović, Richardson (5)	Barclays Center; 17,817	10–7
18	November 28	Milwaukee	L 124–131	Bam Adebayo (31)	Adebayo, Love (10)	Josh Richardson (7)	Kaseya Center; 19,691	10–8
19	November 30	Indiana	W 142–132	Jimmy Butler (36)	Jimmy Butler (11)	Kevin Love (6)	Kaseya Center; 19,604	11–8

December: 8–5 (home: 4–4; road: 4–1)

Game	Date	Team	Score	High points	High rebounds	High assists	Location Attendance	Record
20	December 2	Indiana	L 129–144	Jimmy Butler (33)	Kyle Lowry (8)	Butler, Love (5)	Kaseya Center; 19,650	11–9
21	December 6	@ Toronto	W 112–103	Caleb Martin (24)	Martin, O. Robinson (12)	Jimmy Butler (8)	Scotiabank Arena; 19,084	12–9
22	December 8	Cleveland	L 99–111	Lowry, Richardson (17)	Kevin Love (12)	Kyle Lowry (5)	Kaseya Center; 19,600	12–10
23	December 11	@ Charlotte	W 116–114	Duncan Robinson (24)	Caleb Martin (9)	Jimmy Butler (8)	Spectrum Center; 15,543	13–10
24	December 13	Charlotte	W 115–104	Duncan Robinson (23)	Bryant, Love (9)	Jimmy Butler (10)	Kaseya Center; 19,600	14–10
25	December 14	Chicago	L 116–124	Jaime Jaquez Jr. (22)	Caleb Martin (11)	Jimmy Butler (7)	Kaseya Center; 19,653	14–11
26	December 16	Chicago	W 118–116	Jimmy Butler (28)	Kevin Love (7)	Kyle Lowry (7)	Kaseya Center; 19,815	15–11
27	December 18	Minnesota	L 108–112	Tyler Herro (25)	Kevin Love (10)	Bam Adebayo (6)	Kaseya Center; 19,819	15–12
28	December 20	@ Orlando	W 115–106	Tyler Herro (28)	Tyler Herro (8)	Tyler Herro (7)	Kia Center; 19,129	16–12
29	December 22	Atlanta	W 122–113	Tyler Herro (30)	Bam Adebayo (11)	Bam Adebayo (6)	Kaseya Center; 20,029	17–12
30	December 25	Philadelphia	W 119–113	Jaime Jaquez Jr. (31)	Bam Adebayo (15)	three players (5)	Kaseya Center; 20,162	18–12
31	December 28	@ Golden State	W 114–102	Tyler Herro (26)	Bam Adebayo (11)	Jaime Jaquez Jr. (6)	Chase Center; 18,064	19–12
32	December 30	@ Utah	L 109–117	Bam Adebayo (28)	Bam Adebayo (16)	Tyler Herro (6)	Delta Center; 18,206	19–13

January: 6–10 (home: 4–5; road: 2–5)

Game	Date	Team	Score	High points	High rebounds	High assists	Location Attendance	Record
33	January 1	@ L.A. Clippers	L 104–121	Bam Adebayo (21)	Bam Adebayo (15)	Tyler Herro (6)	Crypto.com Arena; 19,370	19–14
34	January 3	@ L.A. Lakers	W 110–96	Tyler Herro (21)	Kevin Love (14)	Jaime Jaquez Jr. (8)	Crypto.com Arena; 18,997	20–14
35	January 5	@ Phoenix	L 97–113	Bam Adebayo (28)	Bam Adebayo (10)	Josh Richardson (7)	Footprint Center; 17,071	20–15
36	January 8	Houston	W 120–113	Tyler Herro (28)	Bam Adebayo (12)	Duncan Robinson (7)	Kaseya Center; 19,694	21–15
37	January 10	Oklahoma City	L 120–128	Bam Adebayo (25)	Bam Adebayo (11)	Adebayo, Herro (6)	Kaseya Center; 19,636	21–16
38	January 12	Orlando	W 99–96	Duncan Robinson (23)	Bam Adebayo (11)	Bam Adebayo (7)	Kaseya Center; 19,650	22–16
39	January 14	Charlotte	W 104–87	Bam Adebayo (24)	Bam Adebayo (10)	Bam Adebayo (7)	Kaseya Center; 19,831	23–16
40	January 15	@ Brooklyn	W 96–95 (OT)	Jimmy Butler (31)	Bam Adebayo (20)	Kyle Lowry (5)	Barclays Center; 17,893	24–16
41	January 17	@ Toronto	L 97–121	three players (16)	Herro, Jović (7)	Butler, Martin (5)	Scotiabank Arena; 19,631	24–17
42	January 19	Atlanta	L 108–109	Butler, Herro (25)	Bam Adebayo (9)	Adebayo, Butler (6)	Kaseya Center; 20,040	24–18
43	January 21	@ Orlando	L 87–105	Bam Adebayo (22)	Bam Adebayo (11)	Bam Adebayo (7)	Kia Center; 18,102	24–19
44	January 24	Memphis	L 96–105	Tyler Herro (18)	Bam Adebayo (15)	Bam Adebayo (6)	Kaseya Center; 19,600	24–20
45	January 25	Boston	L 110–143	Adebayo, Herro (19)	Adebayo, Bryant (5)	Tyler Herro (6)	Kaseya Center; 20,074	24–21
46	January 27	@ New York	L 109–125	Jimmy Butler (28)	Bam Adebayo (13)	Terry Rozier (7)	Madison Square Garden; 19,812	24–22
47	January 29	Phoenix	L 105–118	Jimmy Butler (26)	Bam Adebayo (11)	Bam Adebayo (5)	Kaseya Center; 19,600	24–23
48	January 31	Sacramento	W 115–106	Jimmy Butler (31)	Bam Adebayo (11)	Terry Rozier (10)	Kaseya Center; 19,600	25–23

February: 8–3 (home: 2–2; road: 6–1)

Game	Date	Team	Score	High points	High rebounds	High assists	Location Attendance	Record
49	February 2	@ Washington	W 110–102	Jimmy Butler (24)	Bam Adebayo (14)	Herro, Rozier (5)	Capital One Arena; 18,308	26–23
50	February 4	L.A. Clippers	L 95–103	Jimmy Butler (21)	Bam Adebayo (13)	Terry Rozier (5)	Kaseya Center; 19,855	26–24
51	February 6	Orlando	W 121–95	Jimmy Butler (23)	Adebayo, Butler (8)	Jimmy Butler (8)	Kaseya Center; 19,600	27–24
52	February 7	San Antonio	W 116–104	Tyler Herro (24)	Jimmy Butler (11)	Jimmy Butler (11)	Kaseya Center; 19,652	28–24
53	February 11	Boston	L 106–110	Tyler Herro (24)	Bam Adebayo (13)	Terry Rozier (6)	Kaseya Center; 20,049	28–25
54	February 13	@ Milwaukee	W 123–97	Nikola Jović (24)	Bam Adebayo (12)	Bam Adebayo (11)	Fiserv Forum; 17,520	29–25
55	February 14	@ Philadelphia	W 109–104	Adebayo, Herro (23)	Bam Adebayo (13)	Tyler Herro (7)	Wells Fargo Center; 20,015	30–25
All-Star Game
56	February 23	@ New Orleans	W 106–95	Bam Adebayo (24)	Jimmy Butler (9)	Jimmy Butler (6)	Smoothie King Center; 18,658	31–25
57	February 26	@ Sacramento	W 121–110	Bam Adebayo (28)	Bam Adebayo (10)	Duncan Robinson (11)	Golden 1 Center; 17,832	32–25
58	February 27	@ Portland	W 106–96	Jimmy Butler (22)	Bam Adebayo (9)	Jimmy Butler (9)	Moda Center; 18,143	33–25
59	February 29	@ Denver	L 97–103	Bam Adebayo (22)	Caleb Martin (9)	Jaime Jaquez Jr. (5)	Ball Arena; 19,634	33–26

March: 8–7 (home: 4–4; road: 4–3)

Game	Date	Team	Score	High points	High rebounds	High assists	Location Attendance	Record
60	March 2	Utah	W 126–120	Jimmy Butler (37)	Bam Adebayo (7)	Terry Rozier (8)	Kaseya Center; 19,858	34–26
61	March 5	Detroit	W 118–110	Jimmy Butler (26)	Bam Adebayo (7)	Jimmy Butler (8)	Kaseya Center; 19,724	35–26
62	March 7	@ Dallas	L 108–114	Terry Rozier (27)	Bam Adebayo (9)	Terry Rozier (11)	American Airlines Center; 20,221	35–27
63	March 8	@ Oklahoma City	L 100–107	Jaime Jaquez Jr. (25)	Butler, Adebayo (10)	Jimmy Butler (8)	Paycom Center; 18,203	35–28
64	March 10	Washington	L 108–110	Jimmy Butler (23)	Bam Adebayo (16)	Butler, Jović, Rozier (4)	Kaseya Center; 19,730	35–29
65	March 13	Denver	L 88–100	Bam Adebayo (17)	Bam Adebayo (13)	Terry Rozier (4)	Kaseya Center; 19,921	35–30
66	March 15	@ Detroit	W 108–95	Bam Adebayo (22)	Bam Adebayo (9)	Caleb Martin (6)	Little Caesars Arena; 19,894	36–30
67	March 17	@ Detroit	W 104–101	Duncan Robinson (30)	Bam Adebayo (17)	Terry Rozier (9)	Little Caesars Arena; 20,004	37–30
68	March 18	@ Philadelphia	L 91–98	Adebayo, Rozier (20)	Bam Adebayo (13)	Bam Adebayo (6)	Wells Fargo Center; 19,782	37–31
69	March 20	@ Cleveland	W 107–104	Jimmy Butler (30)	Thomas Bryant (10)	Jimmy Butler (5)	Rocket Mortgage FieldHouse; 19,432	38–31
70	March 22	New Orleans	L 88–111	Jimmy Butler (17)	Bam Adebayo (10)	Jimmy Butler (5)	Kaseya Center; 19,727	38–32
71	March 24	Cleveland	W 121–84	Haywood Highsmith (18)	Bam Adebayo (16)	Jimmy Butler (6)	Kaseya Center; 19,645	39–32
72	March 26	Golden State	L 92–113	Bam Adebayo (24)	Bam Adebayo (9)	Caleb Martin (6)	Kaseya Center; 19,813	39–33
73	March 29	Portland	W 142–82	Thomas Bryant (26)	Adebayo, Bryant (12)	Bam Adebayo (9)	Kaseya Center; 19,839	40–33
74	March 31	@ Washington	W 119–107	Terry Rozier (27)	Bam Adebayo (9)	Bam Adebayo (5)	Capital One Arena; 16,039	41–33

April: 5–3 (home: 3–2; road: 2–1)

Game	Date	Team	Score	High points	High rebounds	High assists	Location Attendance	Record
75	April 2	New York	W 109–99	Terry Rozier (34)	Bam Adebayo (9)	Butler, Jović (6)	Kaseya Center; 19,857	42–33
76	April 4	Philadelphia	L 105–109	Terry Rozier (22)	Kevin Love (16)	Jimmy Butler (5)	Kaseya Center; 19,719	42–34
77	April 5	@ Houston	W 119–104	Jimmy Butler (22)	Bam Adebayo (12)	Adebayo, Herro (6)	Toyota Center; 18,055	43–34
78	April 7	@ Indiana	L 115–117	Jimmy Butler (27)	Bam Adebayo (12)	Jimmy Butler (8)	Gainbridge Fieldhouse; 17,274	43–35
79	April 9	@ Atlanta	W 117–111 (2OT)	Tyler Herro (33)	Butler, Jović (8)	Jimmy Butler (9)	State Farm Arena; 17,049	44–35
80	April 10	Dallas	L 92–111	Tyler Herro (21)	Kevin Love (11)	Herro, Martin (6)	Kaseya Center; 19,660	44–36
81	April 12	Toronto	W 125–103	Nikola Jović (22)	Kevin Love (8)	Jaime Jaquez Jr. (9)	Kaseya Center; 19,600	45–36
82	April 14	Toronto	W 118–103	Bryant, Jaquez Jr. (18)	Thomas Bryant (10)	Tyler Herro (8)	Kaseya Center; 19,600	46–36

2023–24 season schedule

=== Play-in ===
2024 play-in game log
Total: 1–1 (Home: 1–0; Road: 0–1)
Play-in: 1–1 (home: 1–0; road: 0–1)

Game	Date	Team	Score	High points	High rebounds	High assists	Location Attendance	Record
1	April 17	@ Philadelphia	L 104–105	Tyler Herro (25)	Bam Adebayo (12)	Tyler Herro (9)	Wells Fargo Center; 19,788	0–1
2	April 19	Chicago	W 112–91	Tyler Herro (24)	Tyler Herro (10)	Tyler Herro (9)	Kaseya Center; 19,600	1–1

2023–24 season schedule

=== Playoffs ===
2024 playoff game log
Total: 1–4 (home: 0–2; road: 1–2)
First Round: 1–4 (home: 0–2; road: 1–2)

Game	Date	Team	Score	High points	High rebounds	High assists	Location Attendance	Series
1	April 21	@ Boston	L 94–114	Bam Adebayo (24)	Adebayo, Jović (6)	Herro, Jaquez Jr. (4)	TD Garden; 19,156	0–1
2	April 24	@ Boston	W 111–101	Tyler Herro (24)	Bam Adebayo (10)	Tyler Herro (14)	TD Garden; 19,156	1–1
3	April 27	Boston	L 84–104	Bam Adebayo (20)	Bam Adebayo (9)	Highsmith, Jaquez Jr. (5)	Kaseya Center; 20,092	1–2
4	April 29	Boston	L 88–102	Bam Adebayo (25)	Bam Adebayo (17)	Bam Adebayo (5)	Kaseya Center; 19,600	1–3
5	May 1	@ Boston	L 84–118	Bam Adebayo (23)	Nikola Jović (7)	Bam Adebayo (6)	TD Garden; 19,156	1–4

2024 playoff schedule

=== In-Season Tournament ===
This was the first regular season where all the NBA teams competed in a mid-season tournament setting due to the implementation of the 2023 NBA In-Season Tournament. During the in-season tournament period, the Heat competed in Group B of the Eastern Conference, which included the Milwaukee Bucks, New York Knicks, Washington Wizards, and Charlotte Hornets.

==== East group B ====
Pos	Team	Pld	W	L	PF	PA	PD	Qualification	MIL	NYK	MIA	CHA	WAS
1	Milwaukee Bucks	4	4	0	502	456	+46	Advance to knockout stage	—	110–105	131–124	130–99	131–128
2	New York Knicks	4	3	1	440	398	+42	Advance to knockout stage	105–110	—	100–98	115–91	120–99
3	Miami Heat	4	2	2	454	450	+4		124–131	98–100	—	111–105	121–114
4	Charlotte Hornets	4	1	3	419	473	−54		99–130	91–115	105–111	—	124–117
5	Washington Wizards	4	0	4	458	496	−38		128–131	99–120	114–121	117–124	—

Source: NBA
Rules for classification: Tiebreakers

== Player statistics ==
=== Regular season ===
Player	POS	GP	GS	MP	REB	AST	STL	BLK	PTS	MPG	RPG	APG	SPG	BPG	PPG
Jaime Jaquez Jr.	SF	75	20	2,113	285	195	77	20	889	28.2	3.8	2.6	1.0	.3	11.9
Bam Adebayo	C	71	71	2,416	737	278	81	66	1,367	34.0	10.4	3.9	1.1	.9	19.3
Duncan Robinson	SF	68	36	1,905	173	192	46	16	875	28.0	2.5	2.8	.7	.2	12.9
Haywood Highsmith	PF	66	26	1,366	210	70	53	30	405	20.7	3.2	1.1	.8	.5	6.1
Caleb Martin	SF	64	23	1,756	281	143	47	29	640	27.4	4.4	2.2	.7	.5	10.0
Jimmy Butler	PF	60	60	2,042	318	298	79	17	1,246	34.0	5.3	5.0	1.3	.3	20.8
Kevin Love	PF	55	5	924	338	115	18	10	485	16.8	6.1	2.1	.3	.2	8.8
Nikola Jović	PF	46	38	896	192	90	25	14	352	19.5	4.2	2.0	.5	.3	7.7
Josh Richardson	SG	43	6	1,103	121	105	24	14	425	25.7	2.8	2.4	.6	.3	9.9
Tyler Herro	SG	42	40	1,407	222	188	30	3	875	33.5	5.3	4.5	.7	.1	20.8
Thomas Bryant	C	38	4	441	141	23	10	16	217	11.6	3.7	.6	.3	.4	5.7
Kyle Lowry^{†}	PG	37	35	1,037	129	147	39	15	303	28.0	3.5	4.0	1.1	.4	8.2
Orlando Robinson	C	36	7	304	84	34	7	8	99	8.4	2.3	.9	.2	.2	2.8
Terry Rozier^{†}	PG	31	30	975	130	144	31	9	509	31.5	4.2	4.6	1.0	.3	16.4
Jamal Cain	PF	26	1	259	37	10	10	5	97	10.0	1.4	.4	.4	.2	3.7
Cole Swider	SF	18	0	87	7	5	1	1	42	4.8	.4	.3	.1	.1	2.3
Delon Wright^{†}	PG	14	1	286	27	37	19	3	76	20.4	1.9	2.6	1.4	.2	5.4
Patty Mills^{†}	PG	13	5	213	15	20	11	0	76	16.4	1.2	1.5	.8	.0	5.8
Dru Smith	SG	9	0	131	14	14	9	3	39	14.6	1.6	1.6	1.0	.3	4.3
R. J. Hampton	PG	8	2	76	6	8	0	0	10	9.5	.8	1.0	.0	.0	1.3
Alondes Williams	SG	7	0	16	1	0	0	1	5	2.3	.1	.0	.0	.1	.7

- ^{†} Denotes player spent time with another team in the season. Stats reflect time with the Heat only.

=== Playoffs ===
Player	POS	GP	GS	MP	REB	AST	STL	BLK	PTS	MPG	RPG	APG	SPG	BPG	PPG
Bam Adebayo	C	5	5	192	47	19	2	0	113	38.4	9.4	3.8	.4	.0	22.6
Tyler Herro	SG	5	5	185	18	27	2	0	84	37.0	3.6	5.4	.4	.0	16.8
Caleb Martin	SF	5	5	176	18	7	3	0	58	35.2	3.6	1.4	.6	.0	11.6
Nikola Jović	PF	5	5	128	33	11	5	3	47	25.6	6.6	2.2	1.0	.6	9.4
Haywood Highsmith	PF	5	0	126	14	8	1	1	24	25.2	2.8	1.6	.2	.2	4.8
Duncan Robinson	SF	5	0	60	5	6	2	0	13	12.0	1.0	1.2	.4	.0	2.6
Kevin Love	PF	5	0	32	14	4	0	0	9	6.4	2.8	.8	.0	.0	1.8
Jaime Jaquez Jr.	SF	4	4	123	13	12	3	2	51	30.8	3.3	3.0	.8	.5	12.8
Delon Wright	PG	4	1	107	12	7	4	1	32	26.8	3.0	1.8	1.0	.3	8.0
Patty Mills	PG	3	0	52	1	3	1	0	18	17.3	.3	1.0	.3	.0	6.0
Thomas Bryant	C	2	0	18	5	1	0	0	12	9.0	2.5	.5	.0	.0	6.0
Orlando Robinson	C	1	0	2	1	1	0	0	0	2.0	1.0	1.0	.0	.0	.0

== Transactions ==
=== Free agency ===
==== Re-signed ====
Date	Player	Signed	Ref.
June 30	Kevin Love	2-year contract	
July 1	Orlando Robinson	1-year contract	

==== Additions ====
Date	Player	Former team	Ref.
July 1	Jamaree Bouyea	Sioux Falls Skyforce	
July 1	Dru Smith	Brooklyn Nets	
July 2	Thomas Bryant	Denver Nuggets	
July 2	Josh Richardson	New Orleans Pelicans	
January 23	Terry Rozier	Charlotte Hornets	

==== Subtractions ====
Date	Player	Reason left	New team	Ref.
June 30	Victor Oladipo	Traded	Oklahoma City Thunder	
July 1	Gabe Vincent	Free agency	Los Angeles Lakers	
July 1	Max Strus	Traded	Cleveland Cavaliers	
January 23	Kyle Lowry	Traded	Charlotte Hornets	
