= Caleb Martin (basketball) =

American basketball player (born 1995)

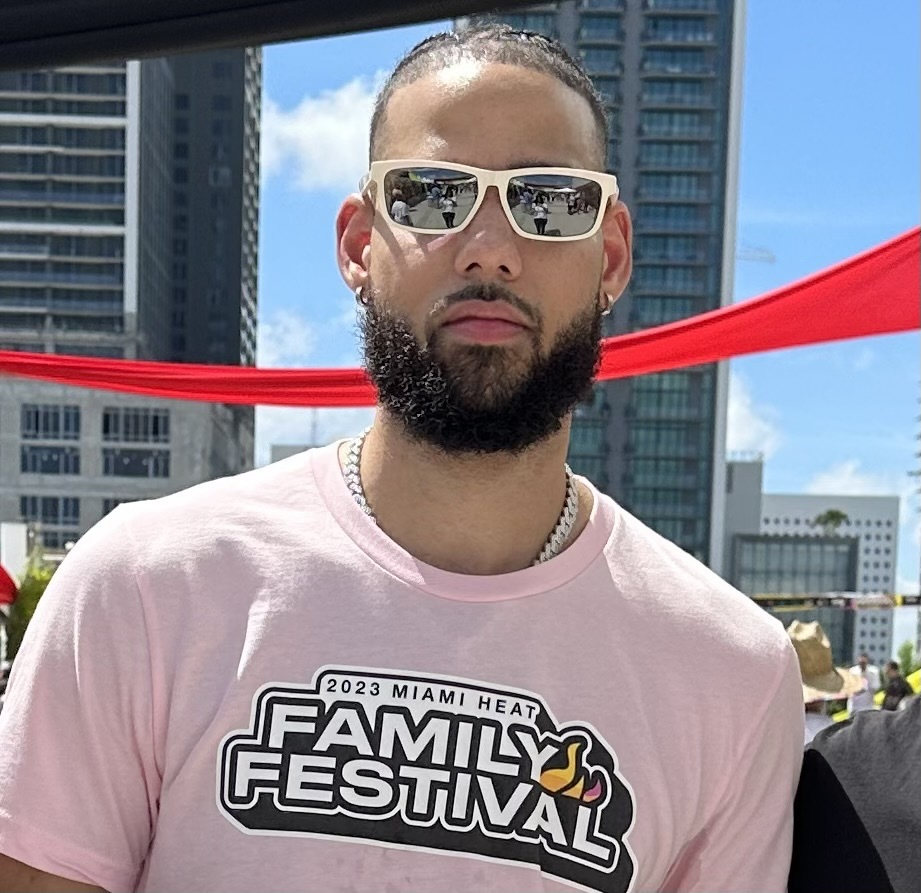
- Martin in 2023

No. 16 – Dallas Mavericks
- Position: Small forward
- League: NBA

Personal information
- Born: September 28, 1995 (age 31) Winston-Salem, North Carolina, U.S.
- Listed height: 6 ft 5 in (1.96 m)
- Listed weight: 205 lb (93 kg)

Career information
- High school: Davie County (Mocksville, North Carolina); Oak Hill Academy (Mouth of Wilson, Virginia)
- College: NC State (2014–2016); Nevada (2017–2019)
- NBA draft: 2019: undrafted
- Playing career: 2019–present

Career history
- 2019–2021: Charlotte Hornets
- 2019–2020: →Greensboro Swarm
- 2021–2024: Miami Heat
- 2024–2025: Philadelphia 76ers
- 2025–present: Dallas Mavericks

Career highlights
- Mountain West Player of the Year (2018); 2× First-team All-Mountain West (2018, 2019); Mountain West Newcomer of the Year (2018)
- Stats at NBA.com
- Stats at Basketball Reference

Caleb Martin (born September 28, 1995) is an American professional basketball player for the Dallas Mavericks of the National Basketball Association (NBA). He played college basketball for the NC State Wolfpack and the Nevada Wolf Pack. He was named the Mountain West Conference Player of the Year for the 2017–18 season by the league's coaches. He is the identical twin brother of Cody Martin.

An undrafted player in the 2019 NBA draft, Martin began his NBA career in the 2019–20 season, where he played two seasons with the Charlotte Hornets before signing with the Miami Heat. During his stint with the Heat, he helped his team reach the NBA Finals in 2023. Since, he has played for the Philadelphia 76ers and the Dallas Mavericks.

== High school career ==
Martin, a 6 ft 5 in (1.96 m) small forward from Mocksville, North Carolina, played basketball for prep powerhouse Oak Hill Academy with twin brother Cody Martin. Prior to playing at Oak Hill, Caleb and his brother played three seasons at Davie County High School in Mocksville. He also played football his freshman year of high school. The two committed to North Carolina State University to play for coach Mark Gottfried.

== College career ==
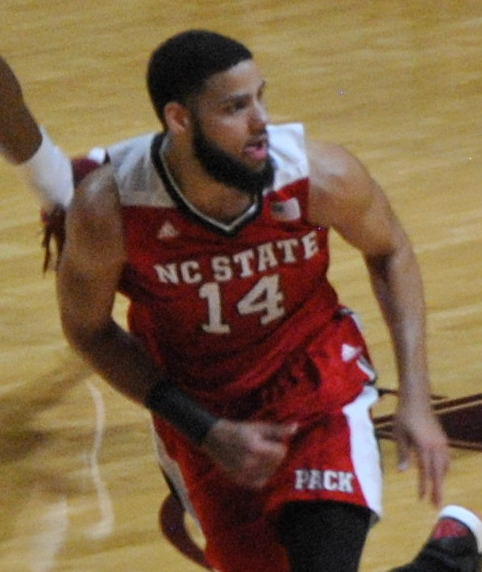
Martin with NC State in 2016

As a sophomore, Martin averaged 11.5 points and 4.7 rebounds per game. Following that season, the Martin twins chose to transfer to Nevada to play for coach Eric Musselman. They thus would play for both the N.C. State Wolfpack and the Nevada Wolf Pack.

After sitting out the 2016–17 season due to NCAA transfer rules, Martin became eligible the following year. He averaged 18.9 points per game in his debut season, being named Mountain West Conference Player of the Year from the league's coaches and Newcomer of the Year from both coaches and league media. He shared Player of the Year honors with Boise State's Chandler Hutchison, who received the MW media version of the award. Martin led the Wolf Pack to a regular season conference championship and a Top 25 ranking. He and his brother then led the team to the 2018 NCAA tournament, where they advanced to the Sweet 16 after coming back from double-digits in wins over Texas and Cincinnati. After finishing out his junior season, Martin and his brother both tested out the 2018 NBA draft and were in the NBA Draft Combine that year, but both ultimately decided to return for their senior seasons.

Coming into his senior season, Martin was named Preseason Mountain West Player of the Year. Martin averaged 19.2 points per game, 5.1 rebounds, and 2.8 assists. He led Nevada to a 29–5 (15–3 MW) record. Martin's college career ended with a loss in the First Round of the NCAA tournament to Florida 61–70. Martin was named to First-Team All Mountain West following the season along with teammate Jordan Caroline.

== Professional career ==
=== Charlotte Hornets / Greensboro Swarm (2019–2021) ===
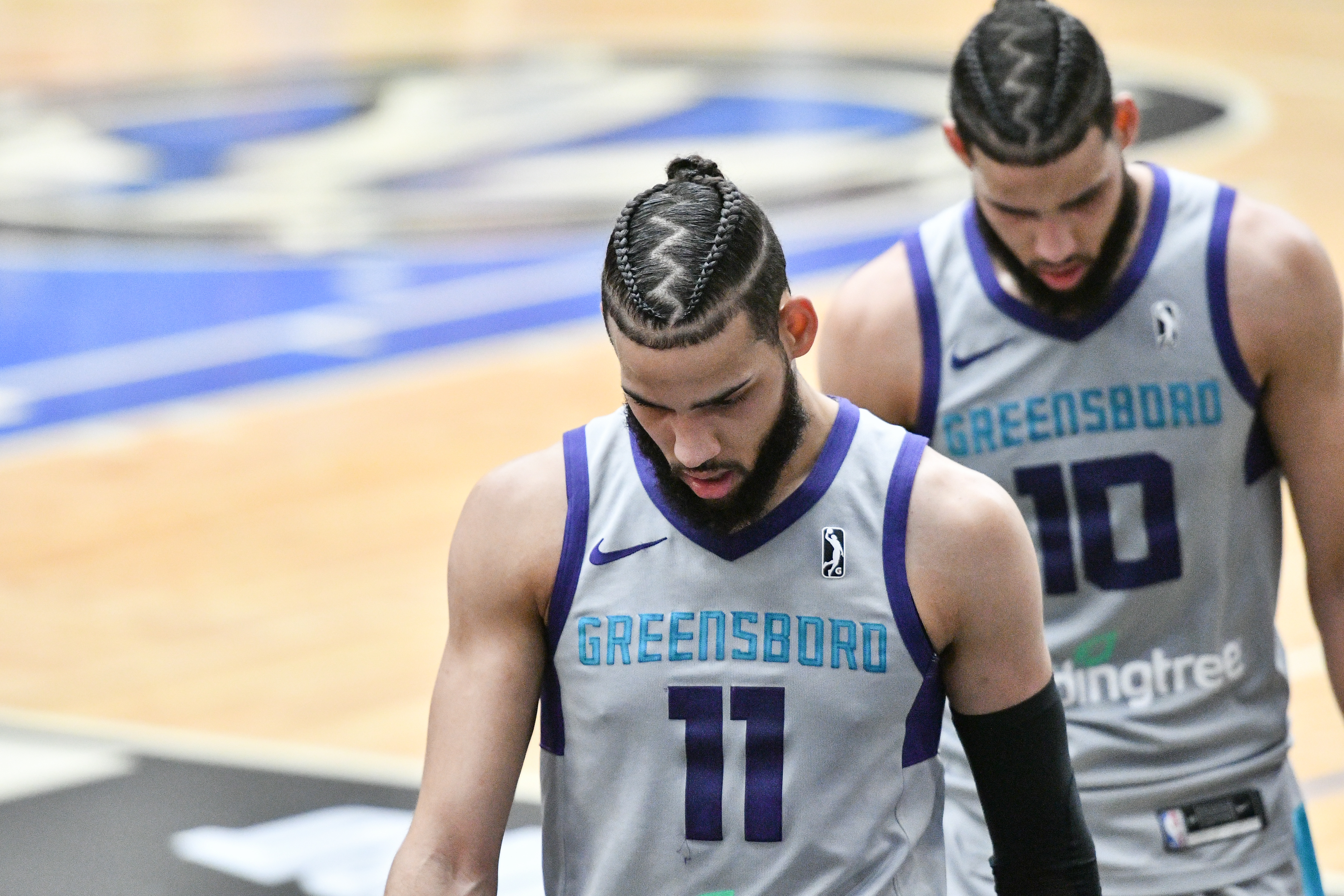
Cody and Caleb Martin (10) in 2019

After going undrafted in the 2019 NBA draft, Martin signed with the Charlotte Hornets on July 31, 2019. He joined his brother Cody, who was selected in the second round of the draft. On October 19, the Hornets converted Martin's contract into a two-way contract. Later the same day, he agreed to a multi-year deal with the Hornets and was converted to a standard deal. On October 25, Martin made his NBA debut, coming off the bench in a 99–121 loss to the Minnesota Timberwolves with four points, two rebounds, three assists, two blocks and a steal. On November 27, he received his first assignment to the Hornets NBA G League affiliate, the Greensboro Swarm. On March 9, 2020, Martin scored a season-high 23 points, alongside four assists, three steals and two blocks, in a 138–143 double overtime loss to the Atlanta Hawks.

On April 13, 2021, Martin scored a season-high 17 points, alongside ten rebounds and five assists, in a 93–101 loss to the Los Angeles Lakers. On May 4, he again scored 17 points, alongside five rebounds, two assists and two steals, in a 102–99 win over the Detroit Pistons.

On August 7, 2021, Martin was waived by the Hornets.

=== Miami Heat / Sioux Falls Skyforce (2021–2024) ===
On September 14, 2021, Martin signed with the Miami Heat on a two-way contract, splitting time with the Sioux Falls Skyforce. He made his Heat debut on October 21, recording five points and two steals in a 137–95 win over the Milwaukee Bucks. On December 8, Martin scored a career-high 28 points, alongside eight rebounds, three assists and two steals, in a 113–104 win over the Bucks. On February 15, 2022, the Heat converted Martin's contract to a standard deal. During the playoffs, the Heat faced the Atlanta Hawks during their first round series. Martin made his playoff debut on April 17, scoring two points in a 115–91 Game 1 win. The Heat reached the Eastern Conference Finals, but were eliminated in seven games by the Boston Celtics.

On July 6, 2022, Martin re-signed with the Heat on a 3-year, $20 million deal. On October 22, 2022, during a 112–109 win over the Toronto Raptors, Martin was ejected after an altercation with Raptors center Christian Koloko. The next day, the NBA suspended Martin for one game without pay due to the altercation.

During the first round of the 2023 NBA playoffs, Martin played a key role in the eight-seed Heat upsetting the top-seeded Milwaukee Bucks, averaging 11.2 points, 5.4 rebounds, and 2 assists per game. On May 19, 2023, Martin scored 25 points during a 111–105 Game 2 Eastern Conference Finals win against the Boston Celtics. In Game 7 of the series, Martin scored 26 points, and grabbed 10 rebounds in a 103–84 win, helping the Heat advance to their second NBA Finals appearance in four years. Martin came one vote short of besting teammate Jimmy Butler for Eastern Conference Finals MVP while averaging 19.3 points and 6.4 rebounds per game, whilst shooting 60.2% from the field and 48.9% from three. Martin struggled in the NBA Finals averaging only 7.4 points on 37.5% shooting. The Heat lost the Finals in 5 games to the Denver Nuggets.

=== Philadelphia 76ers (2024–2025) ===
On July 6, 2024, Martin signed with the Philadelphia 76ers on a four-year, $35 million contract. The Heat had offered him a contract extension totaling five years and $65 million, but Martin did not accept it on time to meet the league deadline, believing he could extract more from another team in free agency. After the deadline, the Heat were prevented by NBA salary cap rules from offering Martin anything close to their initial offer, and Martin was ultimately forced to take the Sixers' much lower offer, losing out on $30 million in what is considered one of the worst "bag fumbles" in recent history. He later stated that he made peace with this outcome because he believed destiny sent him to Philadelphia to win a championship there.

=== Dallas Mavericks (2025–present) ===
On February 4, 2025, Martin was traded to the Dallas Mavericks in exchange for Quentin Grimes and a 2025 second-round pick.

== Career statistics ==
Legend
GP	Games played	GS	Games started	MPG	Minutes per game
FG%	Field goal percentage	3P%	3-point field goal percentage	FT%	Free throw percentage
RPG	Rebounds per game	APG	Assists per game	SPG	Steals per game
BPG	Blocks per game	PPG	Points per game	**Bold**	Career high

=== NBA ===
==== Regular season ====
Year	Team	GP	GS	MPG	FG%	3P%	FT%	RPG	APG	SPG	BPG	PPG
2019–20	Charlotte	18	1	17.6	.440	**.541**	**.810**	2.1	1.3	.7	.4	6.2
2020–21	Charlotte	53	3	15.4	.375	.248	.641	2.7	1.3	.7	.2	5.0
2021–22	Miami	60	12	22.9	**.507**	.413	.763	3.8	1.1	1.0	.5	9.2
2022–23	Miami	**71**	**49**	29.3	.464	.356	.805	**4.9**	1.6	1.0	.4	9.6
2023–24	Miami	64	23	27.4	.431	.349	.778	4.4	**2.2**	.7	.5	**10.0**
2024–25	Philadelphia	31	24	**30.4**	.435	.379	.622	4.4	**2.2**	**1.1**	**.6**	9.1
2024–25	Dallas	14	0	19.6	.389	.250	.625	2.9	1.9	.9	.2	5.4
2025–26	Dallas	58	12	14.8	.450	.351	.607	2.5	1.4	.7	.3	3.9
Career		369	124	22.8	.447	.357	.719	3.7	1.6	.8	.4	7.7

==== Playoffs ====
Year	Team	GP	GS	MPG	FG%	3P%	FT%	RPG	APG	SPG	BPG	PPG
2022	Miami	17	0	12.3	.400	.303	.333	2.2	.3	.6	.1	4.5
2023	Miami	**23**	4	30.2	**.529**	.423	.829	**5.4**	**1.6**	**.9**	**.4**	**12.7**
2024	Miami	5	**5**	**35.1**	.467	**.440**	**1.000**	3.6	1.4	.6	.0	11.6
Career		45	9	24.0	.489	.401	.783	4.0	1.1	.7	.2	9.4

=== College ===
Year	Team	GP	GS	MPG	FG%	3P%	FT%	RPG	APG	SPG	BPG	PPG
2014–15	NC State	**36**	1	16.6	.356	.305	.695	2.9	.7	.3	.3	4.8
2015–16	NC State	33	19	30.3	.389	.361	.667	4.7	1.4	.9	.6	11.5
2017–18	Nevada	**36**	26	33.3	**.454**	**.403**	**.749**	**5.4**	2.6	1.3	.6	18.9
2018–19	Nevada	34	**33**	**34.1**	.409	.338	.732	5.1	**2.8**	**1.4**	**.8**	**19.2**
Career		139	79	28.5	.414	.359	.725	4.5	1.9	1.0	.6	13.6
