= Jaime Jaquez Jr. =

American-Mexican basketball player (born 2001)

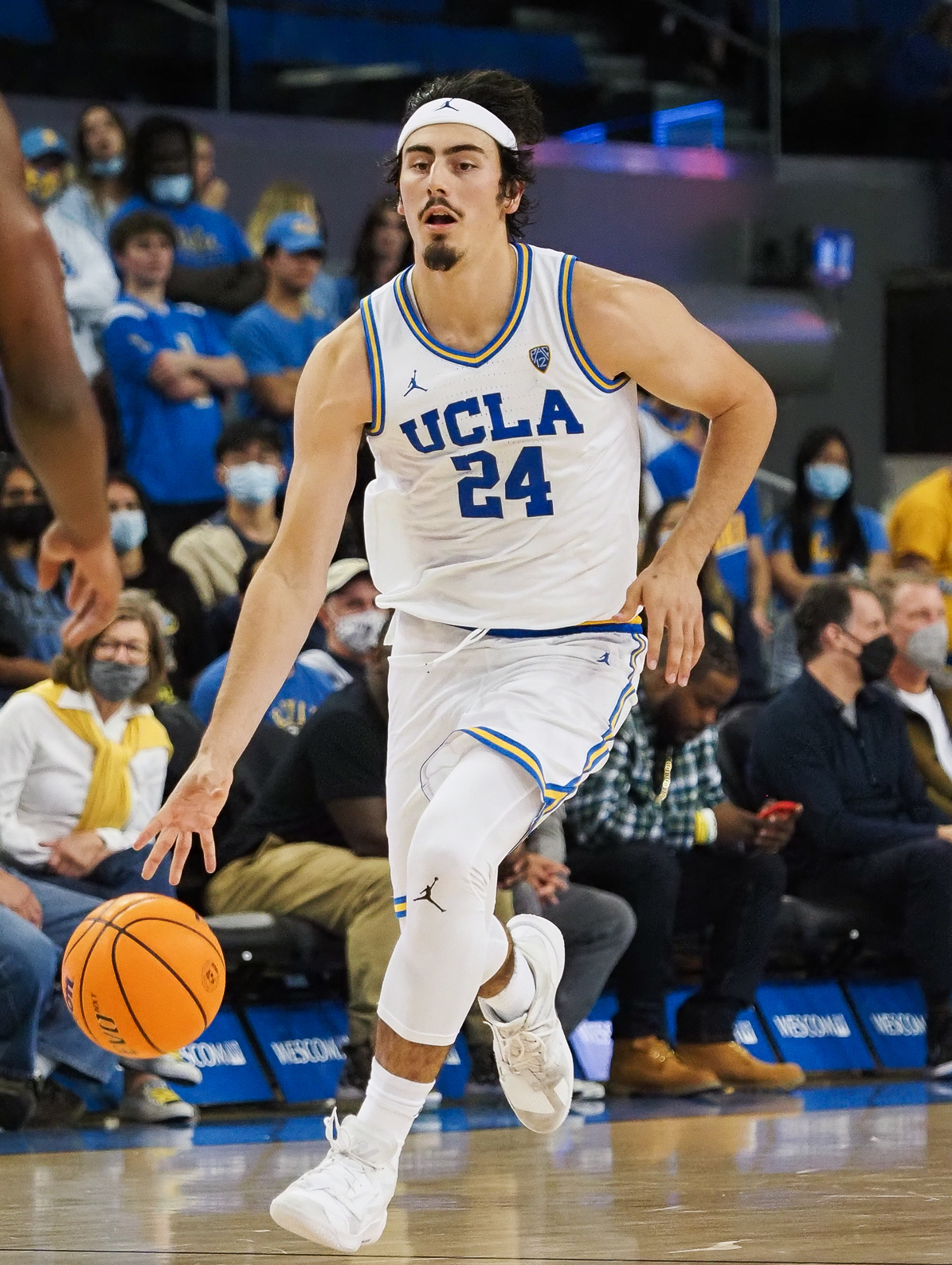
- Jaquez Jr. with UCLA in 2021

No. 24 – Milwaukee Bucks
- Position: Small Forward
- League: NBA

Personal information
- Born: February 18, 2001 (age 25) Irvine, California, U.S.
- Listed height: 6 ft 6.5 in (1.99 m)
- Listed weight: 225 lb (102 kg)

Career information
- High school: Camarillo (Camarillo, California)
- College: UCLA (2019–2023)
- NBA draft: 2023: 1st round, 18th overall pick
- Drafted by: Miami Heat
- Playing career: 2023–present

Career history
- 2023–2026: Miami Heat
- 2026–present: Milwaukee Bucks

Career highlights
- NBA All-Rookie First Team (2024); Consensus second-team All-American (2023); Lute Olson Award (2023); Pac-12 Player of the Year (2023); 2× First-team All-Pac-12 (2022, 2023); Second-team All-Pac-12 (2021); 2× Pac-12 All-Defensive Team (2021, 2022)
- Stats at NBA.com
- Stats at Basketball Reference

Jaime Jaquez Jr. (/ˈhaɪmɛ ˈhɑːkɛz/ HY-meh HAH-kez; born February 18, 2001) is a Mexican-American professional basketball player for the Milwaukee Bucks of the National Basketball Association (NBA). He played college basketball for the UCLA Bruins. During his senior season in 2023, he was recognized as a consensus second-team All-American and was named the Pac-12 Player of the Year. Over the course of his collegiate career, Jaquez was selected three times to the All-Pac-12 team, including two first-team honors, and was twice named to the Pac-12 All-Defensive Team. He was selected by the Miami Heat with the 18th overall pick in the first round of the 2023 NBA draft. Jaquez is also known by the nickname "Juan Wick," which reflects his Mexican heritage and a perceived resemblance to the character John Wick.

== Early life ==
Jaquez was born on February 18, 2001, in Irvine, California, and grew up in Camarillo. He is the third generation in his family to play college basketball. His parents, Angela (née Sather) and Jaime Sr., both played basketball at Concordia University Irvine, where they first met. His paternal grandfather, Ezequiel, immigrated to California from Mexico as a child and played basketball at Ventura College and Northern Arizona University.

== High school career ==
Jaquez attended Adolfo Camarillo High School in Camarillo, California, and graduated in 2019. As a freshman, he averaged 15.3 points, 10.0 rebounds, 2.3 assists, and 2.6 steals per game, leading the team to a 25–7 record and an appearance in the California Interscholastic Federation (CIF) semifinals. In his sophomore season, he earned All-Ventura County second-team honors while averaging 24.1 points, 10.9 rebounds, 2.2 assists, and 2.6 steals per game, despite missing 12 games due to an ankle injury. During his senior season, Jaquez averaged 31.7 points, 11.7 rebounds, 3.7 assists, and 2.1 steals per game, guiding the team to a 25–4 record and its first Coastal Canyon League (CCL) title. He received first-team All-CIF Southern Section honors and finished his high school career with a total of 2,653 points. Jaquez also set a school single-game scoring record with a 54-point performance against Royal High School. In addition to basketball, he also played as a pitcher on the school's baseball team.

== College career ==
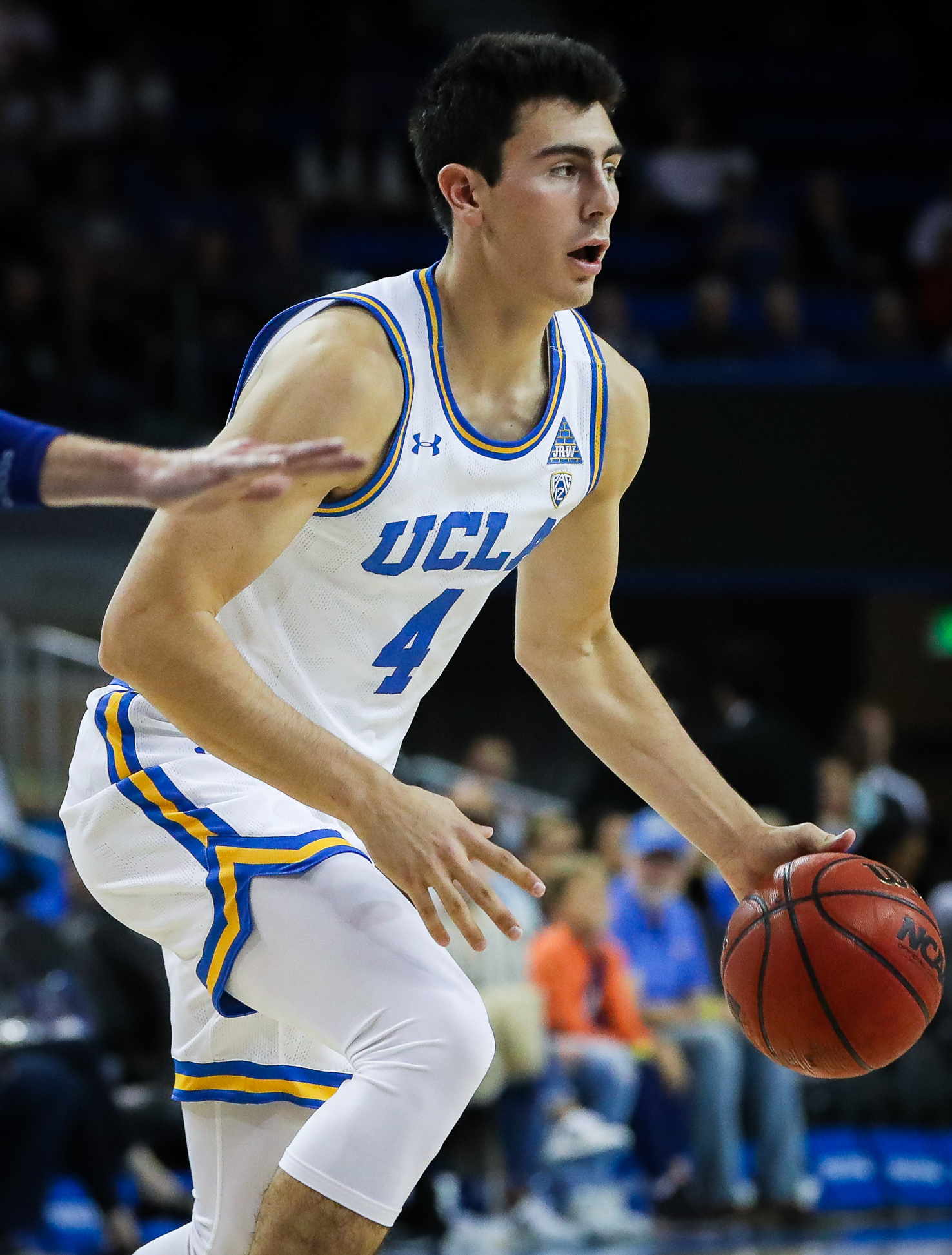
Jaquez as a UCLA freshman in 2019

Jaquez was recruited to the University of California, Los Angeles (UCLA), by then-Bruins' coach Steve Alford, who offered him a scholarship at the end of his junior year. However, Alford was fired in 2018, replaced later by Mick Cronin, who had recruited Jaquez while coaching at Cincinnati. Jaquez did not seriously pursue another school, and remained committed to UCLA. He became a starter for the Bruins during the 2019 Maui Jim Maui Invitational, after recording 17 points and 12 rebounds in a 74–48 win against Chaminade on November 26. On December 1, he scored a season-high 18 points in a 93–64 win over San Jose State. On February 27, 2020, he scored 18 points and shot the game-winning three-pointer with 0.6 seconds remaining in a 75–72 win over Arizona State. Jaquez concluded his freshman season averaging 8.9 points and 4.8 rebounds per game. His performance earned him an honorable mention to the Pac-12 All-Freshman Team.

On February 18, 2021, Jaquez scored 25 points on his 20th birthday in a 74–60 win over Arizona, the Bruins' fifth straight in its rivalry with the Wildcats. For the season, he was a second-team All-Pac-12 selection and was named to the Pac-12 All-Defensive Team. In UCLA's First Four play-in game of the 2021 NCAA tournament, he led the Bruins in scoring with 27 points in a 86–80 overtime win against Michigan State. UCLA advanced to the Final Four, ultimately losing 93–90 to Gonzaga on April 3.

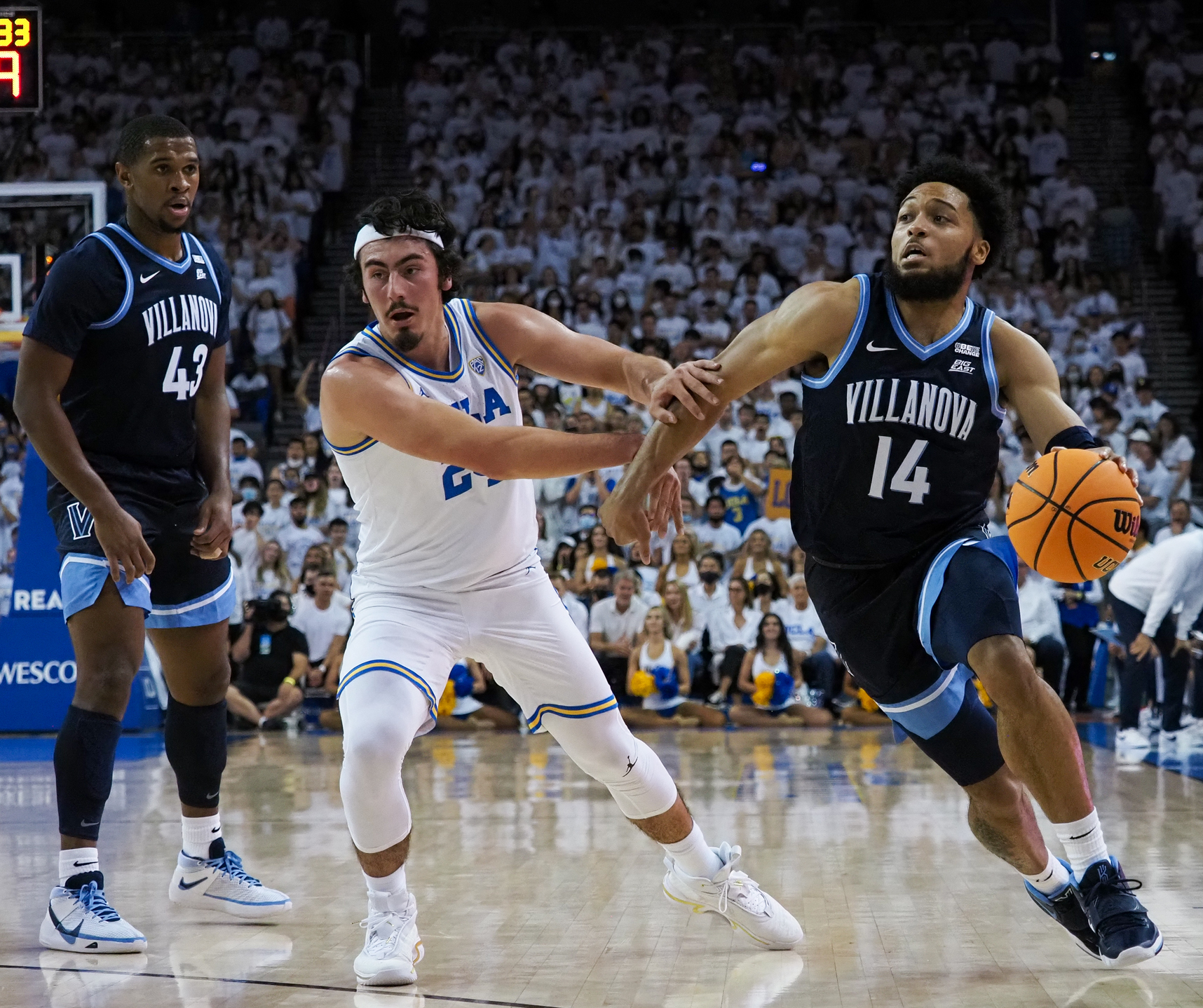
Jaquez defending Caleb Daniels of Villanova in 2021

Jaquez was restricted by ankle injuries throughout most of the 2021–22 season. He suffered from synovitis in one ankle and began wearing braces on both ankles as a preventative measure. He bounced back from a three-game stretch in mid-February 2022 in which he scored a combined 13 points. On February 28, Jaquez scored a career-high 30 points in a 77–66 win over Washington. In the following game, on March 5, he scored 27 points in the regular-season finale against USC, helping UCLA end its five-game losing streak in their crosstown rivalry with the Trojans. He was named the Pac-12 Player of the Week after averaging 28.5 points on 64 percent shooting along with 7.5 rebounds, as the Bruins clinched the No. 2 seed in the Pac-12 tournament. Jaquez was named to the All-Pac-12 first team and was voted again to the conference's defensive team. He was one of five finalists for the Julius Erving Award, given to the top small forward in the country. In the second round of the 2022 NCAA tournament, on March 19, he scored 15 points in a 72–56 win over Saint Mary's, but exited the game and did not return after spraining his right ankle with seven minutes remaining in the second half. He was averaging 20.5 points in his last eight games, with the Bruins going 7–1. The stretch coincided with him being able to resume practicing, while UCLA's leading scorer, Johnny Juzang, was in a scoring slump. Jaquez recovered to play 38 minutes in the following game on March 25 against North Carolina in the Sweet Sixteen, but the Bruins lost 73–66. He scored 10 points, shooting 1-for-11 in the second half and missing his final nine shots. Amid the injuries, Jaquez's 3-point shooting dropped to 27.6 percent. Along with needing surgery in April to remove bone spurs from his right ankle, he decided against declaring for the NBA draft, and returned to UCLA for his senior year.

For the second straight season, Jaquez was named a finalist for the Julius Erving Award in 2022–23. On February 4, 2023, he had a game-high 24 points and a career-high 15 rebounds in a 76–52 win over Washington State. That month, he scored late baskets in multiple games to help lead the team to victories, including seven points in 3 1/2 minutes as the Bruins secured a 78–71 win over Utah on February 23. He led UCLA to their first Pac-12 regular season title since 2013. The Bruins received a No. 2 seed in the 2023 NCAA tournament. In the opener, on March 16, Jaquez recorded 17 points, eight rebounds, and a career-high five steals in an 86–53 victory over No. 15-seed UNC Asheville. Losing two starters, Adem Bona and Jaylen Clark, due to injuries, UCLA concluded their season with a 79–76 loss to Gonzaga in the Sweet Sixteen on March 23. For the season, Jaquez averaged 17.8 points and 8.2 rebounds. He was named a consensus second-team All-American, and received the Lute Olson Award as the college player of the year. Jaquez was voted the Pac-12 Player of the Year, becoming the first Bruin to win since Kevin Love in 2008 and the first UCLA senior to capture the award since Ed O'Bannon in 1995. He also earned his second consecutive first-team all-conference selection. After the season, Jaquez declared for the 2023 NBA draft, forgoing the extra year of eligibility that was available due to the COVID-19 pandemic. He ended his career ranked eighth in UCLA history in career scoring (1,802) and career steals (178), and ninth in total games played (134).

== Professional career ==
=== Miami Heat (2023–2026) ===
==== 2023–24 season ====
Jaquez was considered a borderline first-round prospect after his college career and received an invitation to the green room for the 2023 NBA draft. He was selected by the Miami Heat with the eighteenth overall pick, making him the only Pac-12 player chosen in the first round. Jaquez became the first UCLA senior to be selected in the first round since Darren Collison in 2009. He officially signed with the Heat on July 1. Shortly afterward, he participated in the 2023 Summer League with the team but played only two games before a left shoulder injury sidelined him.

Jaquez began the 2023–24 regular season on a minutes restriction due to a groin injury sustained during the preseason. He made his National Basketball Association (NBA) debut on October 25, 2023, in the Heat's season opener against the Detroit Pistons, scoring his first basket on a layup with 26 seconds remaining in the first quarter, tying the score at 26–26. He finished the game with six points, having made all three of his field goal attempts, along with two rebounds, contributing to a 103–102 victory. Three days later, on October 28, Jaquez made his first career start against the Minnesota Timberwolves, filling in alongside Nikola Jović for absent veterans Jimmy Butler and Kevin Love. He recorded seven points and three rebounds in a 106–90 loss. On November 30, he scored a then-career-high 24 points and grabbed 5 rebounds in a 142–132 win over the Indiana Pacers. Jaquez was named the Eastern Conference Rookie of the Month on December 4 in recognition of his performances in October and November, becoming the fifth Heat rookie to earn the award and marking the tenth time it has been awarded to a Heat player. He joined previous winners such as Caron Butler (four-time recipient), Kendrick Nunn (three-time recipient), Josh Richardson, and Michael Beasley. On December 25, Jaquez achieved season and then-career highs with 31 points and 10 rebounds in 39 minutes played during a 119–113 victory over the Philadelphia 76ers. He earned a second consecutive Eastern Conference Rookie of the Month award for December, announced on January 4, 2024. Jaquez was selected to participate in the 2024 NBA All-Star Weekend Rising Stars Challenge and the Slam Dunk Contest, which were held on February 16 and 17, respectively. He concluded the season having started 20 games and played in 75 of the 82 regular-season games, the most on the 2023–24 Heat roster, averaging 11.9 points and 3.8 rebounds while shooting 48.9 percent from the field. Jaquez was named to the NBA All-Rookie First Team and finished fourth in NBA Rookie of the Year voting.

==== 2024–25 season ====
In the final game of the 2024–25 regular season on April 13, 2025, Jaquez scored a career-high 41 points and grabbed 10 rebounds in a narrow 119–118 loss to the Washington Wizards. The Heat had only nine players available for the game as several rotation players sat out ahead of the play-in tournament. Jaquez missed four of the previous nine games due to a coach's decision.

==== 2025–26 season ====
Jaquez improved his minutes, points, rebounds, and assists per game in the 2025–26 season, averaging 28.3 minutes and 15.4 points per game. He led the NBA in total bench points with 1,138, and was second in voting for the NBA Sixth Man of the Year award, behind winner Keldon Johnson of the San Antonio Spurs.

=== Milwaukee Bucks (2026–present) ===
On July 6, 2026, Jaquez, alongside Tyler Herro, Kasparas Jakučionis, Kel'el Ware, the rights to Nate Ament and four more future draft picks, were traded to the Milwaukee Bucks in exchange for Giannis Antetokounmpo and Bobby Portis. On October 21, Jaquez made his Bucks debut, putting up 22 points, seven rebounds and two assists in a 128–116 loss to the Washington Wizards.

== National team career ==
Jaquez is a Mexican-American dual citizen who represented Mexico at the 2019 Pan American Games in Lima, Peru.

== Career statistics ==
Legend
GP	Games played	GS	Games started	MPG	Minutes per game
FG%	Field goal percentage	3P%	3-point field goal percentage	FT%	Free throw percentage
RPG	Rebounds per game	APG	Assists per game	SPG	Steals per game
BPG	Blocks per game	PPG	Points per game	**Bold**	Career high

=== NBA ===
==== Regular season ====
Year	Team	GP	GS	MPG	FG%	3P%	FT%	RPG	APG	SPG	BPG	PPG
2023–24	Miami	**75**	**20**	28.2	.489	**.322**	**.811**	3.8	2.6	**1.0**	**.3**	11.9
2024–25	Miami	66	17	20.7	.466	.311	.754	4.4	2.5	.9	.2	8.6
2025–26	Miami	**75**	1	**28.3**	**.507**	.317	.768	**5.0**	**4.7**	.7	**.3**	**15.4**
Career		216	38	25.9	.491	.317	.779	4.4	3.3	.9	.3	12.1

==== Playoffs ====
Year	Team	GP	GS	MPG	FG%	3P%	FT%	RPG	APG	SPG	BPG	PPG
2024	Miami	**4**	**4**	**30.6**	**.404**	**.231**	.857	**3.3**	**3.0**	**.8**	**.5**	**12.8**
2025	Miami	3	0	6.3	.167	.000	**1.000**	1.3	.3	.0	.0	1.3
Career		7	4	20.3	.379	.200	.889	2.4	1.9	.4	.3	7.9

=== College ===
Year	Team	GP	GS	MPG	FG%	3P%	FT%	RPG	APG	SPG	BPG	PPG
2019–20	UCLA	31	23	26.6	.454	.313	.761	4.8	1.4	1.4	.4	8.9
2020–21	UCLA	32	32	**34.9**	**.486**	**.394**	.655	6.1	1.7	1.2	**.7**	12.3
2021–22	UCLA	34	34	30.5	.472	.276	.761	5.7	2.3	1.1	.3	13.9
2022–23	UCLA	**37**	**37**	33.2	.481	.317	**.770**	**8.2**	**2.4**	**1.5**	.6	**17.8**
Career		134	126	31.4	.475	.328	.737	6.3	2.0	1.3	.5	13.4

== Personal life ==
Jaquez is of Mexican descent through his father, and of Norwegian descent through his mother.

Jaquez is the oldest of three siblings. His younger sister, Gabriela, played college basketball for the UCLA Bruins and was named co-MVP at the 2022 McDonald's All-American Girls Game. She was drafted by the Chicago Sky in the 2026 WNBA draft. His younger brother, Marcos, plays college football as a defensive lineman for Ventura College.
