= Orlando Robinson =

American basketball player (born 2000)

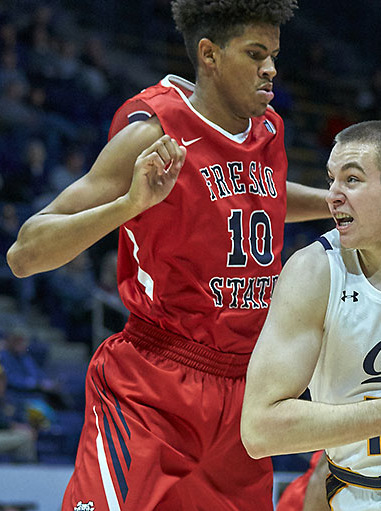
- Robinson with Fresno State in 2019

No. 00 – Windy City Bulls
- Position: Center
- League: NBA G League

Personal information
- Born: July 10, 2000 (age 26) Las Vegas, Nevada, U.S.
- Listed height: 6 ft 10 in (2.08 m)
- Listed weight: 235 lb (107 kg)

Career information
- High school: Centennial (Las Vegas, Nevada); Cathedral (Los Angeles, California); Middlebrooks Academy (Los Angeles, California)
- College: Fresno State (2019–2022)
- NBA draft: 2022: undrafted
- Playing career: 2022–present

Career history
- 2022: Sioux Falls Skyforce
- 2022–2024: Miami Heat
- 2022–2024: →Sioux Falls Skyforce
- 2024–2025: Sacramento Kings
- 2024–2025: →Stockton Kings
- 2025: Toronto Raptors
- 2025: →Raptors 905
- 2025–2026: Orlando Magic
- 2025–2026: →Osceola Magic
- 2026: Memphis Hustle
- 2026: Windy City Bulls
- 2026–present: Chicago Bulls
- 2026–present: →Windy City Bulls

Career highlights
- First-team All-Mountain West (2022); Second-team All-Mountain West (2021)
- Stats at NBA.com
- Stats at Basketball Reference

Orlando Lamon Robinson Jr. (born July 10, 2000) is an American professional basketball player for the Windy City Bulls of the NBA G League, on assignment from the Chicago Bulls of the National Basketball Association (NBA). He played college basketball for Fresno State. Robinson has played for the Miami Heat, Sacramento Kings, Toronto Raptors and Orlando Magic in his NBA tenure.

== High school career ==
Robinson began his high school career at Centennial High School in Las Vegas. Prior to his junior season, he transferred to Cathedral High School in Los Angeles and scored 29 points in his first game. Robinson attended Middlebrooks Academy for his senior season. On October 11, 2018, he committed to Fresno State over offers from Oregon State, Georgia Tech and Boise State.

== College career ==
Robinson averaged 12.2 points and 6.6 rebounds per game as a freshman. In the offseason, he worked on his ballhandling and strength training in the midst of the COVID-19 pandemic. On January 4, 2021, he scored a career-high 33 points and had 13 rebounds in an 81–61 win against Wyoming. As a sophomore, Robinson averaged 14.6 points, 9.2 rebounds and 2.1 assists per game and had 11 double-doubles. He was named to the Second Team All-Mountain West and received CoSIDA Academic All-District honors. Following the season, Robinson declared for the 2021 NBA draft while maintaining his college eligibility. On July 2, 2021, he withdrew from the draft and returned to Fresno State for his junior season. Robinson was named to the First Team All-Mountain West as a junior.

== Professional career ==
=== Miami Heat / Sioux Falls Skyforce (2022–2024) ===
After going undrafted in the 2022 NBA draft, Robinson was signed by the Miami Heat on July 14, 2022.

On October 24, 2022, Robinson joined the Heat's G League affiliate, the Sioux Falls Skyforce, for training camp. On November 13, Robinson was signed to a two-way contract with the Heat. He was waived by the Heat on November 25, and subsequently re-joined the Skyforce. However, on December 11, he signed a second two-way contract. The Heat made the 2023 NBA Finals, but lost to the Denver Nuggets in five games. As a player under a two-way contract, Robinson was ineligible to play in the playoffs.

On July 1, 2023, the Heat signed Robinson to a two-year standard contract, relieving him of his co-assignment to the Skyforce. On July 7, 2024, the Heat waived Robinson.

=== Sacramento / Stockton Kings (2024–2025) ===
On August 7, 2024, Robinson signed a one-year deal with the Sacramento Kings. On October 7, 2024, Robinson suffered an MCL sprain that ruled him out for at least four weeks. Throughout the season, he was assigned several times to the Stockton Kings. On January 7, 2025, he was waived by the Kings.

=== Toronto Raptors (2025) ===
On January 18, 2025, Robinson signed a 10-day contract with the Toronto Raptors and ten days later, he signed a second one. Following the expiration of his second 10-day contract, Robinson signed a two-way contract with the Raptors on February 7. In 35 appearances (8 starts) for Toronto, he averaged 8.1 points, 5.9 rebounds, and 1.9 assists. On April 10, Robinson was waived by the Raptors.

=== Orlando Magic (2025–2026) ===
On July 21, 2025, Robinson signed a two-way contract with the Orlando Magic. He made four appearances (including one start) for Orlando, averaging 1.8 points, 1.0 rebound, and 0.8 assists. On February 17, 2026, Robinson was waived by the Magic following the signing of Alex Morales.

=== Windy City Bulls (2026–present) ===
On September 29, 2026, Robinson was acquired by the Windy City Bulls.

=== Chicago Bulls (2026–present) ===
On November 13, 2026, Robinson was upgraded from the Windy City Bulls to the Chicago Bulls.

== Career statistics ==
Legend
GP	Games played	GS	Games started	MPG	Minutes per game
FG%	Field goal percentage	3P%	3-point field goal percentage	FT%	Free throw percentage
RPG	Rebounds per game	APG	Assists per game	SPG	Steals per game
BPG	Blocks per game	PPG	Points per game	**Bold**	Career high

=== NBA ===
==== Regular season ====
Year	Team	GP	GS	MPG	FG%	3P%	FT%	RPG	APG	SPG	BPG	PPG
2022–23	Miami	31	1	13.7	.528	.000	.710	4.1	.8	**.4**	**.4**	3.7
2023–24	Miami	**36**	7	8.4	.500	**.533**	.760	2.3	.9	.2	.2	2.8
2024–25	Sacramento	9	0	6.3	.412	.200	.571	1.6	1.0	.3	.1	2.1
2024–25	Toronto	35	**8**	**20.4**	.447	.340	**.794**	**5.9**	**1.9**	**.4**	**.4**	**8.1**
2025–26	Orlando	4	1	8.4	**.600**	.500	–	1.0	.8	.3	.0	1.8
Career		115	17	13.3	.473	.347	.754	3.8	1.2	.3	.3	4.6

==== Playoffs ====
Year	Team	GP	GS	MPG	FG%	3P%	FT%	RPG	APG	SPG	BPG	PPG
2024	Miami	1	0	2.5	.000	.000	—	1.0	1.0	.0	.0	.0
Career		1	0	2.5	.000	.000	—	1.0	1.0	.0	.0	.0

=== College ===
Year	Team	GP	GS	MPG	FG%	3P%	FT%	RPG	APG	SPG	BPG	PPG
2019–20	Fresno State	30	30	27.3	**.492**	.250	.705	6.6	1.6	.8	1.0	12.2
2020–21	Fresno State	24	24	31.9	.443	.333	**.721**	**9.2**	2.1	.9	.8	14.6
2021–22	Fresno State	**36**	**36**	**33.2**	.484	**.352**	.716	8.4	**2.9**	**1.0**	**1.2**	**19.4**
Career		90	90	30.9	.476	.322	.714	8.0	2.2	.9	1.0	15.7
