= Haywood Highsmith =

American basketball player (born 1996)

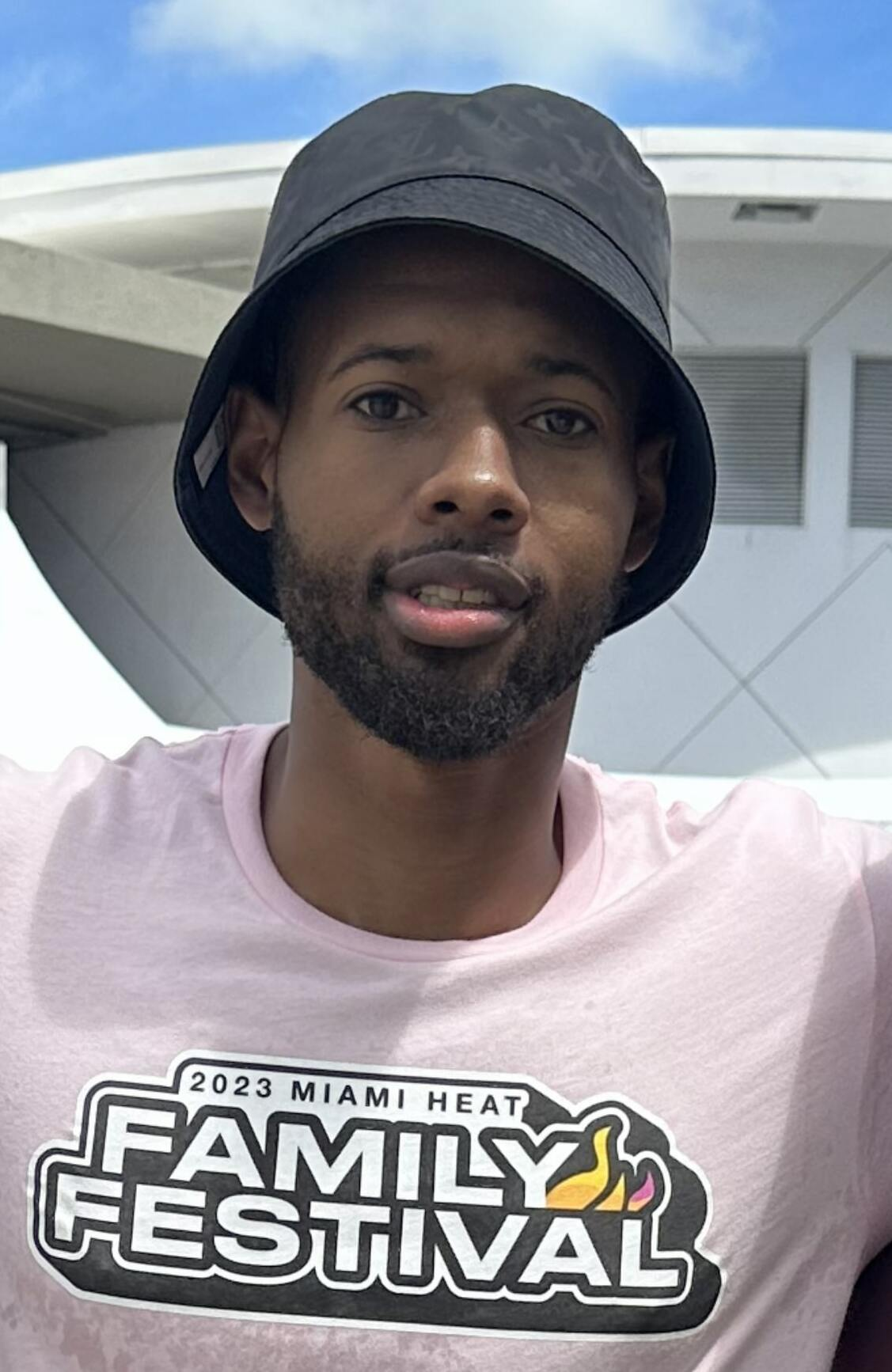
- Highsmith in 2023

Free agent
- Position: Small forward / power forward

Personal information
- Born: December 9, 1996 (age 29) Baltimore, Maryland, U.S.
- Listed height: 6 ft 5 in (1.96 m)
- Listed weight: 220 lb (100 kg)

Career information
- High school: Archbishop Curley (Baltimore, Maryland)
- College: Wheeling (2014–2018)
- NBA draft: 2018: undrafted
- Playing career: 2018–present

Career history
- 2018–2019: Delaware Blue Coats
- 2019: Philadelphia 76ers
- 2019: →Delaware Blue Coats
- 2019–2020: Delaware Blue Coats
- 2020–2021: Crailsheim Merlins
- 2021: Delaware Blue Coats
- 2021–2022: Miami Heat
- 2022: Delaware Blue Coats
- 2022–2025: Miami Heat
- 2026: Phoenix Suns

Career highlights
- First-team Division II All-American – NABC (2018); MEC Player of the Year (2018); 2× First-team All-MEC (2016, 2018); MEC tournament MVP (2018)
- Stats at NBA.com
- Stats at Basketball Reference

Haywood Lee Highsmith Jr. (born December 9, 1996) is an American professional basketball player who last played for the Phoenix Suns of the National Basketball Association (NBA). He played college basketball for the Cardinals of Wheeling Jesuit University and was the NCAA Division II Player of the Year as a senior in 2018. Highsmith was born in Baltimore.

After not being selected in the 2018 NBA draft, Highsmith began his professional basketball career with the Delaware Blue Coats of the NBA G League in 2018. Late in the 2018–19 season, Highsmith made his NBA debut with the Blue Coats' parent team Philadelphia 76ers. In later years, Highsmith played in multiple stints with the Blue Coats, the Crailsheim Merlins of the German Basketball Bundesliga, and the Miami Heat.

== Early life and college career ==
Originally from Baltimore, Highsmith graduated from Archbishop Curley High School in Baltimore in 2014 where he was classmates with NFL wide receiver Deonte Harty of the Baltimore Ravens. His high school coach Brian Hubbard told The Baltimore Sun that Highsmith drew little interest from NCAA Division I colleges.

After high school, Highsmith attended Wheeling Jesuit University (now Wheeling University) and played four seasons for the Wheeling Jesuit Cardinals from 2014 to 2018. He became a starter for the team towards the end of his freshman season. He averaged 14.5 points and 9.4 rebounds as a sophomore, his first full year as a starter, and was named first team All-Mountain East Conference (MEC). In his junior season, Highsmith averaged 15.3 points and 10.8 rebounds and was named second- team All-MEC. As a senior, Highsmith averaged 22 points and 12.6 rebounds per game and was named first-team All-MEC, MEC Player of the Year, and the MVP of the MEC Conference tournament. Nationally, he was named first-team Division II All-America by the National Association of Basketball Coaches and the National Player of the Year by the Division II Conference Commissioner's Association.

== Professional career ==
=== Delaware Blue Coats (2018–2019) ===
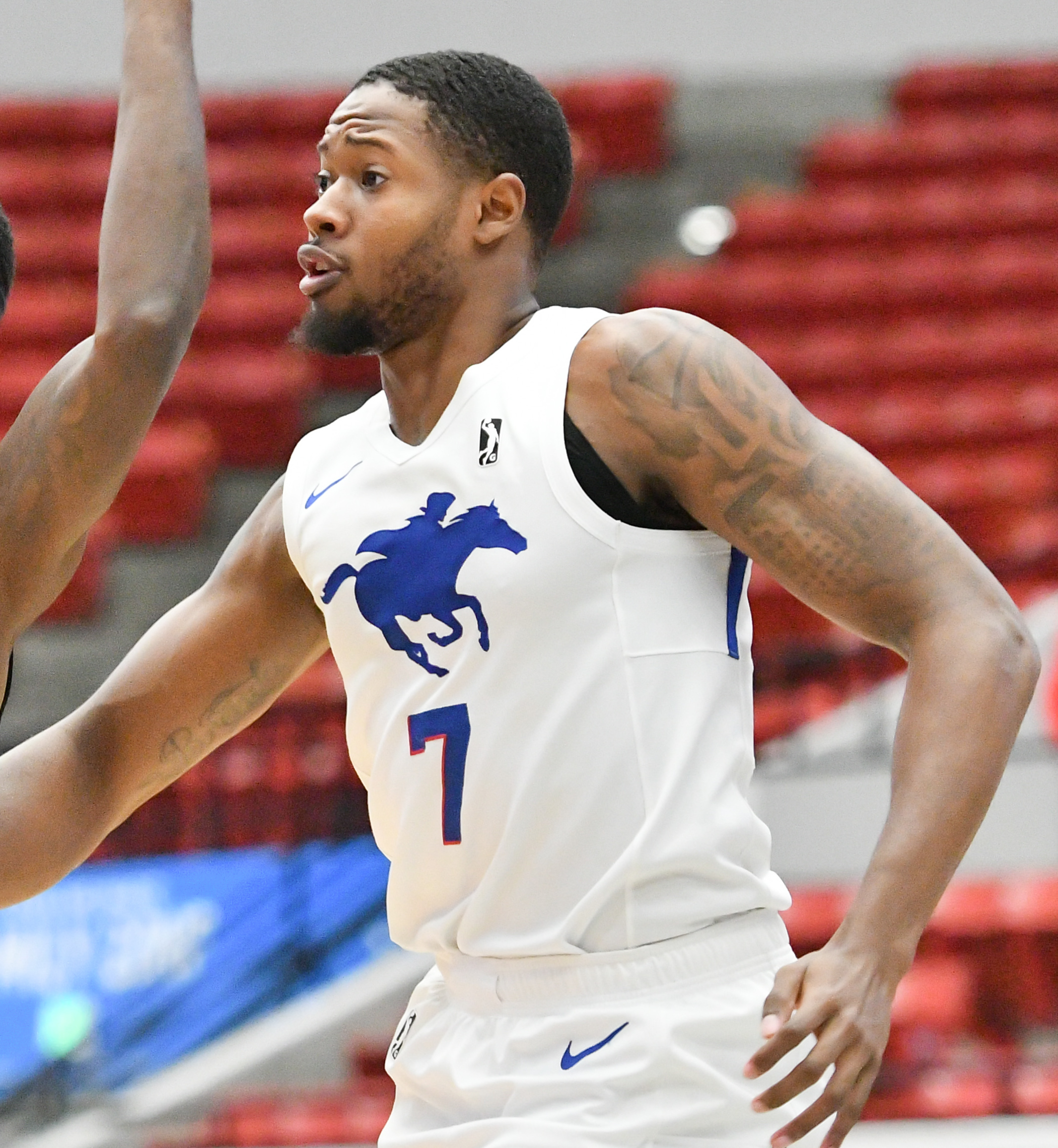
Highsmith in 2019

After going undrafted in the 2018 NBA draft, Highsmith signed with the Delaware Blue Coats of the NBA G League through a local tryout. He averaged 13.7 points per game in 21 appearances.

=== Philadelphia 76ers (2019) ===
Highsmith was signed to a two-way contract by the Philadelphia 76ers on January 8, 2019. Under the terms of the deal, he split time between the 76ers and the Blue Coats. Highsmith made his NBA debut the same day, scoring three points in five minutes of play in a 132–115 win over the Washington Wizards, after also playing in a game for the Blue Coats against Raptors 905 earlier in the day. Highsmith finished his first professional season averaging 1.8 points and one rebound over five NBA games and 12.2 points, 6.8 rebounds, 2.5 assists, and 1.2 steals over 46 G League games (42 starts).

On June 24, 2019, the 76ers waived Highsmith.

=== Return to the Blue Coats (2019–2020) ===
After his Exhibit 10 deal with the Phoenix Suns fell through, Highsmith returned to the 76ers to sign an Exhibit 10 contract.

Highsmith re-joined the Blue Coats for the 2019–20 season. On December 31, Highsmith posted 20 points, eight rebounds, one assist and one steal in a loss to the Maine Red Claws. He averaged 10.8 points and 6.9 rebounds per game.

=== Crailsheim Merlins (2020–2021) ===
On September 4, 2020, Highsmith signed with the Crailsheim Merlins of the Basketball Bundesliga, for whom he averaged 7.9 points and 4.4 rebounds per game.

=== Third stint with the Blue Coats (2021) ===
On July 27, 2021, Highsmith signed with Vanoli Cremona of the Italian Lega Basket Serie A (LBA) with an NBA exit option. As an Exhibit 10 offer arrived from the Philadelphia 76ers, he decided to take advantage of that option and leave Cremona to return to the U.S. On September 30, he signed for and was waived by the 76ers.

Highsmith rejoined the Blue Coats in 2021. He averaged 14.0 points, 5.0 rebounds, and 1.9 assists per game.

=== Miami Heat (2021–2022) ===
On December 30, 2021, Highsmith signed a 10-day contract with the Miami Heat via the hardship exemption.

=== Fourth stint with the Blue Coats (2022) ===
On January 9, 2022, Highsmith was reacquired by the Delaware Blue Coats.

=== Second stint with Heat (2022–2025) ===
On February 15, 2022, Highsmith signed a standard 10-day contract with the Miami Heat. Ten days later, he signed a second 10-day contract. Following the expiration of the second 10-day contract, Highsmith signed a three-year deal to remain with the Heat.

On December 20, 2022, Highsmith scored a career-high 18 points, alongside two rebounds, two assists and four steals, in a 113–103 loss to the Chicago Bulls. The Heat qualified for the play-in tournament and advanced to face the top-seeded Milwaukee Bucks in the first round, whom they defeated in five games in a historic upset. In game 5 of the Eastern Conference Finals, Highsmith scored a then-playoff career-high 15 points, alongside two rebounds and two steals, in a 110–97 loss to the Boston Celtics. The Heat eventually defeated the Celtics in seven games to advance to the 2023 edition of the NBA Finals against the Denver Nuggets. In game 1 of the Finals, Highsmith matched his career high of 18 points, alongside two rebounds and two steals, in a 104–93 loss. The Heat went on to lose the series in five games.

On July 8, 2024, Highsmith re-signed with the Heat on two-year, $10.8 million contract. He made 74 appearances (42 starts) for Miami during the 2024–25 NBA season, averaging 6.5 points, 3.4 rebounds, and 1.5 assists.

On August 8, 2025, it was announced that Highsmith had suffered a meniscus tear in his right knee during a training session; he was ruled out for 8-to-10 weeks after undergoing surgery.

=== Phoenix Suns (2026) ===
On August 15, 2025, Highsmith was traded to the Brooklyn Nets alongside a 2032 second-round pick in exchange for a $5.6 million trade exception and a 2026 protected second-round pick. On October 19, it was announced that Highsmith would remain out for at least eight weeks after suffering a setback in his recovery from meniscal surgery.

On February 5, 2026, Highsmith was waived by the Nets. On February 18, he signed a two-year, $3.85 million contract with the Phoenix Suns. Highsmith made seven appearances for the Suns during the 2025–26 NBA season, averaging 5.4 points and 1.9 rebounds.

On August 12, 2026, Highsmith was waived by the Suns. He re–signed with Phoenix five days later on a one–year contract.

== Career statistics ==
Legend
| GP | Games played | GS | Games started | MPG | Minutes per game |
| FG% | Field goal percentage | 3P% | 3-point field goal percentage | FT% | Free throw percentage |
| RPG | Rebounds per game | APG | Assists per game | SPG | Steals per game |
| BPG | Blocks per game | PPG | Points per game | **Bold** | Career high |

=== NBA ===
==== Regular season ====
| Year | Team | GP | GS | MPG | FG% | 3P% | FT% | RPG | APG | SPG | BPG | PPG |
|---|---|---|---|---|---|---|---|---|---|---|---|---|
| 2018–19 | Philadelphia | 5 | 0 | 8.0 | .400 | .200 | .000 | 1.0 | .4 | .2 | .0 | 1.8 |
| 2021–22 | Miami | 19 | 1 | 8.6 | .348 | .321 | .400 | 1.4 | .3 | .1 | .2 | 2.3 |
| 2022–23 | Miami | 54 | 11 | 18.0 | .431 | .339 | .464 | **3.5** | .8 | .7 | .3 | 4.4 |
| 2023–24 | Miami | 66 | 26 | 20.7 | .465 | .396 | .639 | 3.2 | 1.1 | .8 | **.5** | 6.1 |
| 2024–25 | Miami | **74** | **42** | **24.6** | .458 | .382 | .721 | 3.4 | **1.5** | **.9** | **.5** | **6.5** |
| 2025–26 | Phoenix | 7 | 0 | 13.0 | **.522** | **.571** | **.857** | 1.9 | 1.0 | .6 | .0 | 5.4 |
| Career | | 225 | 80 | 19.8 | .450 | .379 | .620 | 3.1 | 1.1 | .7 | .4 | 5.4 |

==== Playoffs ====
| Year | Team | GP | GS | MPG | FG% | 3P% | FT% | RPG | APG | SPG | BPG | PPG |
|---|---|---|---|---|---|---|---|---|---|---|---|---|
| 2022 | Miami | 8 | 0 | 3.9 | .429 | **.600** | — | .6 | .4 | .0 | .0 | 1.1 |
| 2023 | Miami | **18** | 0 | 8.9 | **.615** | .500 | .800 | 1.3 | .3 | .6 | .1 | 3.3 |
| 2024 | Miami | 5 | 0 | **25.1** | .357 | .188 | **1.000** | 2.8 | **1.6** | .2 | .2 | 4.8 |
| 2025 | Miami | 4 | 0 | 21.0 | .579 | .467 | — | **3.3** | 1.0 | **.8** | **.5** | **7.3** |
| 2026 | Phoenix | 2 | 0 | 5.5 | .000 | .000 | — | 1.5 | .5 | .0 | .0 | .0 |
| Career | | 37 | 0 | 11.2 | .505 | .389 | .833 | 1.6 | .6 | .4 | .1 | 3.3 |

== Personal life ==
Highsmith's father, Haywood, played college basketball for the Fairmont State Fighting Falcons and was inducted into the Fairmont State Athletics Hall of Fame in 2012.
