= Tyler Herro =

American basketball player (born 2000)

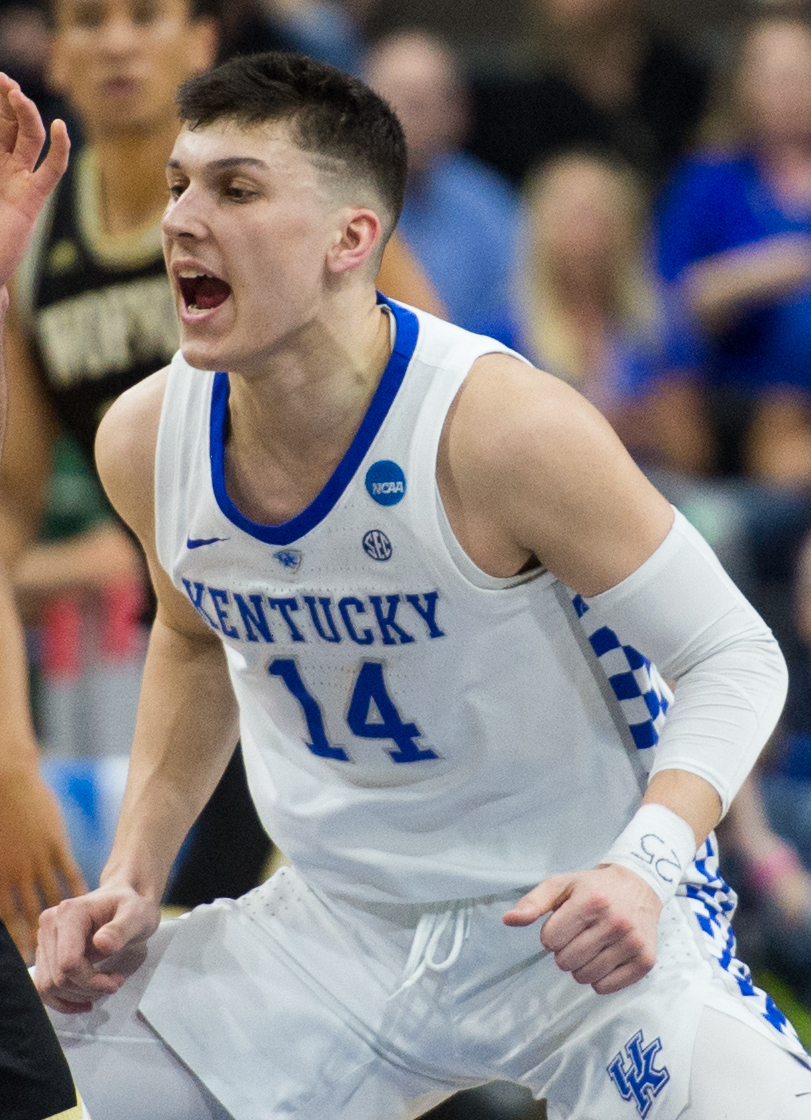
- Herro with Kentucky in 2019

No. 11 – Milwaukee Bucks
- Position: Shooting guard
- League: NBA

Personal information
- Born: January 20, 2000 (age 26) Milwaukee, Wisconsin, U.S.
- Listed height: 6 ft 5 in (1.96 m)
- Listed weight: 195 lb (88 kg)

Career information
- High school: Whitnall (Greenfield, Wisconsin)
- College: Kentucky (2018–2019)
- NBA draft: 2019: 1st round, 13th overall pick
- Drafted by: Miami Heat
- Playing career: 2019–present

Career history
- 2019–2026: Miami Heat
- 2026–present: Milwaukee Bucks

Career highlights
- NBA All-Star (2025); NBA Sixth Man of the Year (2022); NBA All-Rookie Second Team (2020); NBA Three-Point Contest champion (2025); Second-team All-SEC (2019); SEC Newcomer of the Year (2019); SEC All-Freshman Team (2019)
- Stats at NBA.com
- Stats at Basketball Reference

Tyler Christopher Herro (/ˈhiːroʊ/ HEE-roh; born January 20, 2000) is an American professional basketball player for the Milwaukee Bucks of the National Basketball Association (NBA). He played college basketball for the Kentucky Wildcats. Herro was selected by the Miami Heat in the first round of the 2019 NBA draft with the 13th overall pick.

With the Heat, Herro was named to the NBA All-Rookie Second Team in 2020 and reached the NBA Finals in 2020 and 2023. He was named the NBA Sixth Man of the Year in 2022 and was named to his first All-Star Game in 2025. Herro has played both point guard and shooting guard at the professional level.

== Early life ==
Herro was born in Milwaukee, Wisconsin, and graduated from Whitnall High School in Greenfield, Wisconsin. In his senior season, he was named to the First Team All-State as he averaged 32.9 points, 7.4 rebounds, 3.6 assists, and 3.3 steals per game; his field goal percentage was over 50 and his three-point shooting percentage was 43.5. He scored more than 2,000 points in his high school career.

In high school, Herro received scholarship offers from the University of Wisconsin–Madison, Marquette University, DePaul University, Oregon State University, and Arizona State University. He committed to play for the University of Wisconsin after visiting the Madison campus many times. The commitment to the University of Wisconsin–Madison program was made before his junior year of high school in September 2016. In 2017 University of Kentucky coach John Calipari came to the Whitnall High School gymnasium to see Herro play in person. Herro then de-committed from Wisconsin on October 17, 2017. When Herro was no longer committed to play for Madison, he was recruited by the University of Kansas and University of Kentucky. Calipari offered Herro a scholarship on October 31, 2017. Herro then visited the Kentucky campus and decided to play for Kentucky. Herro signed his letter of intent with Kentucky on November 14, 2017.

College recruiting
| Name | Hometown | School | Height | Weight | Commit date |
|---|---|---|---|---|---|
| Tyler Herro; SG | Greenfield, WI | Whitnall (WI) | 6 ft 5 in (1.96 m) | 193 lb (88 kg) | Nov 14, 2017 |
| Tyler Herro; SG | Recruit ratings: Rivals: 247Sports: ESPN: (89) | | | | |
Overall recruit ranking: Rivals: 36 247Sports: 38 ESPN: 30
Note: In many cases, Scout, Rivals, 247Sports, On3, and ESPN may conflict in their listings of height and weight.; In these cases, the average was taken. ESPN grades are on a 100-point scale.; Sources: "Kentucky 2018 Basketball Commitments". Rivals.; "2018 Kentucky Wildcats Recruiting Class". ESPN.; "2018 Team Ranking". Rivals.

== College career ==
In his one year at Kentucky, Herro averaged 14.0 points, 4.5 rebounds and 2.5 assists as the only player to start in all 37 games for the Wildcats. On February 27, 2019, he scored a collegiate career-high 29 points, making 9 of 10 field goals and all of 6 free throws, to lead the Wildcats to a comeback victory over the Arkansas Razorbacks, 70–66. Among other distinctions earned, he was named an All-Freshman First Team selection by Basketball Times as well as the Southeastern Conference Rookie of the Year by the Associated Press. On April 12, 2019, Herro declared for the 2019 NBA draft, forgoing his final three years of college eligibility and hiring an agent. He was listed as a mid-first-round selection in most mock drafts.

== Professional career ==
=== Miami Heat (2019–2026) ===
On June 20, 2019, Herro was selected by the Miami Heat with the 13th overall pick in the 2019 NBA draft. On July 10, the Heat announced that it had signed Herro.

==== 2019–2021: Rookie season and first Finals appearance ====
On October 23, he made his NBA debut, starting in a 120–101 victory over the Memphis Grizzlies and finishing the season-opener with 14 points to go along with 8 rebounds, 2 steals and an assist. In his fourth game (and first non-start), Herro scored a career-high 29 points on October 29 in a 112–97 win over the Atlanta Hawks. Herro was due to play in the Rising Stars game during the All-Star Weekend in 2020, but was ruled out due to an ankle injury. On August 12, 2020, he scored a career-high 30 points in a 116–115 loss to the Oklahoma City Thunder.

When the Heat defeated the Milwaukee Bucks in the second round of the 2020 NBA playoffs on September 8, 2020, Herro became the first player in NBA history born in the 2000s to appear in an NBA Conference Finals game. On September 15, he was named to the 2019–20 NBA All-Rookie Second Team by the league. In game 4 of the 2020 Eastern Conference Finals, he scored a career-high 37 points, becoming the fourth player in playoffs history to record 30-plus points before turning 21 and the second-highest scorer under 21, with only Magic Johnson scoring more. He also set Conference Finals records for the youngest player (at 20 years, 247 days old) to score 30-plus points and the most points by a rookie. After an Eastern Conference Finals victory against the Boston Celtics, Herro became the first player born in the 2000s to play in an NBA Finals.

During game 2 of the 2020 NBA Finals, Herro became the youngest player to start an NBA Finals game at 20 years, 256 days—eight days younger than Magic Johnson was when he started game 1 for the Lakers in 1980 against the Philadelphia 76ers. In game 4 of the same Finals series, he achieved the most three-pointers made by a rookie in NBA playoffs history, accomplishing 45 three-point shots while surpassing Matt Maloney's record 43 threes during the 1997 playoffs. On October 9, 2020, Herro broke a 44-year-old record by scoring 10 points on the third quarter of the game 5 of the 2020 NBA Finals—setting the NBA record by a rookie for the most consecutive games in the playoffs scoring in double digits with 20 while surpassing Alvan Adams's record of 19 games of the Phoenix Suns in 1976. The Heat lost the series in 6 games to the Los Angeles Lakers.

On January 12, 2021, Herro scored a season-high 34 points, alongside seven rebounds and four assists, in a 134–137 overtime loss to the Philadelphia 76ers. On February 17, he grabbed a career-high-tying 15 rebounds, alongside 11 points and four assists, in a 112–120 loss to the Golden State Warriors. On May 16, Herro logged a career-high 11 assists, alongside 16 points and six rebounds, in a 120–107 win over the Detroit Pistons. In the 2021 playoffs, the Heat lost in four games to the eventual champion Milwaukee Bucks in the first round.

==== 2021–2023: Sixth Man of the Year and second Finals appearance ====
On October 23, 2021, Herro became the first player in Heat franchise history to record at least 30 points and 10 rebounds off the bench, which he achieved in a 102–91 loss to the Indiana Pacers. On April 5, 2022, he scored a season-high 35 points, alongside six rebounds and three assists, in a 144–115 win over the Charlotte Hornets. Herro was named the 2022 NBA Sixth Man of the Year, making him the first player in Heat franchise history to win the award.

During the first round of the playoffs, the Heat eliminated the Atlanta Hawks in five games. On May 2, 2022, during the Heat's second-round series against the Philadelphia 76ers, Herro recorded 25 points and seven assists in a 106–92 game 1 win. The Heat defeated the 76ers in six games and advanced to the Eastern Conference Finals, where they faced the Boston Celtics. Herro missed games 3 through 6 of the series with a groin injury. He returned for game 7, but only played seven minutes as the Heat were eliminated in a 100–96 loss.

On October 2, 2022, Herro signed a four-year, $130 million contract extension with the Miami Heat. On November 2, Herro put up 26 points alongside a game-winning three in a 110–107 win over the Sacramento Kings. On November 27, Herro recorded his first career triple-double with 11 points, 11 rebounds and 10 assists in a 106–98 victory over the Atlanta Hawks. On December 15, Herro put up a then career-high 41 points on 10-of-15 shooting from three-point range alongside five rebounds in a 111–108 win over the Houston Rockets. He also became the youngest player in NBA history to put up at least 40 points, 10 three-pointers made and five rebounds in a game. On December 31, Herro put up a buzzer-beating, game-winning three-pointer in a 126–123 win against the Utah Jazz. He finished the game with 29 points, nine rebounds, six assists and two steals. Herro ended the year as league leader in free-throw percentage at 93.4%.

Herro broke his right hand in the first round of the 2023 playoffs against the Milwaukee Bucks. He was expected to be out for at least six weeks after undergoing surgery. Even though he became available to play in game 5 of the NBA Finals against the Denver Nuggets, the Heat did not play him before losing the game and series to the Nuggets.

==== 2023–2025: First All-Star appearance and Three-Point contest champion ====
On October 30, 2023, Herro scored a season-high 35 points during a 122–114 loss to the Milwaukee Bucks. On April 24, 2024, in Game 2 of the First Round against the Boston Celtics, Herro put up 24 points, five rebounds and a playoff career-high 14 assists in a 111–101 victory to even the series. Herro's statistics were nearly identical to the previous year during the regular season, but took a noticeable decline in the playoffs. Miami would ultimately lose the series in five games as Boston would go on to be the eventual NBA champions. In May, Heat president Pat Riley labeled Herro as "fragile" during a press conference, referencing the fact that he had missed nearly half of the season due to injuries.

On November 12, 2024, Herro scored 40 points and made 10 three-pointers in a 123–121 overtime loss to the Detroit Pistons. His 10 three-pointers equaled the Heat franchise record. On December 29, Herro helped the Heat rally from a 12-point deficit by recording a game-high 27 points, as well as nine assists and six rebounds, in a 104–100 victory over the Houston Rockets. With 35 seconds left in the game, became entangled with Rockets player Amen Thompson as the ball was being inbounded before Thompson threw him to the floor. The subsequent altercation resulted in him, Thompson and four other people being ejected. By the end of December, Herro was leading the Heat in passes made, assists, potential assists and points via assists during the season, recording career highs in all categories. His efficiency had also increased for numerous shot types and areas as he more frequently attacked the rim rather than attempt long two-pointers.

By mid-January, Herro was "not only been the Heat’s most available player this season, he’s also been the team’s most reliable and best source of offense" while averaging his best season to date according to the Miami Herald. On January 30, 2025, Herro was named as a reserve player for the 2025 NBA All-Star Game, his first selection. On February 15, Herro won the NBA Three-Point Contest in San Francisco, defeating Buddy Hield and Darius Garland in the final round. With the departure of Jimmy Butler in February 2025, Herro was seen as the most probable successor to leading the team through the post-season. On April 1, Herro recorded 25 points and nine assists in a 124–103 win over the Boston Celtics.

On April 16, Herro scored 38 points, the most ever scored by a single Heat player in a play-in game, during a 109–90 win over the Chicago Bulls. On April 18, Herro scored 30 points, including two three-pointers in overtime, during a 123–114 win against the Atlanta Hawks in the play-in. The win allowed the Heat to become the first tenth seed team to clinch a playoff appearance. On April 23, in game 2 of the first round of the playoffs, Herro scored 33 points in a 112–121 loss against the Cleveland Cavaliers. Herro scored only four points on 1-of-10 shooting in a 138–83 blowout loss to the Cavaliers in game 4, completing the four-game sweep and eliminating the Heat.

==== 2025–2026: Surgery and return ====
On September 19, 2025, Herro underwent surgery to alleviate posterior impingement syndrome in his left ankle, and was ruled out for the beginning of the 2025–26 NBA season. He made his season debut in a 106–102 victory over the Dallas Mavericks on November 24, recording 24 points on 12-of-18 shooting. On March 9, 2026, Herro was named the NBA Eastern Conference Player of the Week for the second time in his career for Week 20 (March 2–8) of the season after leading the Miami Heat to a 4–0 record while averaging 26.3 points, 5.5 rebounds and 4.8 assists during the week.

=== Milwaukee Bucks (2026–present) ===
On July 6, 2026, Herro, alongside Jaime Jaquez Jr., Kasparas Jakučionis, Kel'el Ware, the rights to Nate Ament and four more future draft picks, was traded to the Milwaukee Bucks in exchange for Giannis Antetokounmpo and Bobby Portis. On October 21, Herro made his Bucks debut, recording 24 points and nine assists in a 128–116 loss to the Washington Wizards. On November 21, 2026, Herro scored a career-high 50 points in a 132–129 loss to the Philadelphia 76ers. He shot 15-of-23 from the field, 7-of-12 from three-point range, and 13-of-13 from the free-throw line, while recording 11 rebounds, seven assists, one steal, and seven three-pointers. He shot a potentially game-tying buzzer beater three pointer that was waived off.

== Career statistics ==
Legend
| GP | Games played | GS | Games started | MPG | Minutes per game |
| FG% | Field goal percentage | 3P% | 3-point field goal percentage | FT% | Free throw percentage |
| RPG | Rebounds per game | APG | Assists per game | SPG | Steals per game |
| BPG | Blocks per game | PPG | Points per game | **Bold** | Career high |
| * | Led the league |

=== NBA ===
==== Regular season ====
| Year | Team | GP | GS | MPG | FG% | 3P% | FT% | RPG | APG | SPG | BPG | PPG |
|---|---|---|---|---|---|---|---|---|---|---|---|---|
| 2019–20 | Miami | 55 | 8 | 27.4 | .428 | .389 | .870 | 4.1 | 2.2 | .6 | .2 | 13.5 |
| 2020–21 | Miami | 54 | 15 | 30.3 | .439 | .360 | .803 | 5.0 | 3.4 | .6 | .3 | 15.1 |
| 2021–22 | Miami | 66 | 10 | 32.6 | .447 | **.399** | .868 | 5.0 | 4.0 | .7 | .1 | 20.7 |
| 2022–23 | Miami | 67 | 67 | 34.9 | .439 | .378 | **.934*** | **5.4** | 4.2 | .8 | .2 | 20.1 |
| 2023–24 | Miami | 42 | 40 | 33.5 | .441 | .396 | .856 | 5.3 | 4.5 | .7 | .1 | 20.8 |
| 2024–25 | Miami | **77** | **77** | **35.4** | .472 | .375 | .878 | 5.2 | **5.5** | **.9** | .2 | **23.9** |
| 2025–26 | Miami | 33 | 28 | 31.3 | **.480** | .378 | .917 | 4.8 | 4.1 | .7 | **.4** | 20.5 |
| Career | | 394 | 245 | 32.5 | .450 | .382 | .878 | 5.0 | 4.1 | .7 | .2 | 19.5 |
| All-Star | | 1 | 0 | 8.0 | .500 | .500 | — | .0 | 1.0 | .0 | .0 | 6.0 |

==== Playoffs ====
| Year | Team | GP | GS | MPG | FG% | 3P% | FT% | RPG | APG | SPG | BPG | PPG |
|---|---|---|---|---|---|---|---|---|---|---|---|---|
| 2020 | Miami | **21** | **5** | 33.6 | .433 | .375 | .870 | **5.1** | 3.7 | .4 | .1 | 16.0 |
| 2021 | Miami | 4 | 0 | 23.2 | .316 | .316 | **1.000** | 3.3 | 1.8 | .3 | .3 | 9.3 |
| 2022 | Miami | 15 | 0 | 25.4 | .409 | .229 | .926 | 3.9 | 2.8 | **.6** | .4 | 12.6 |
| 2023 | Miami | 1 | 1 | 19.5 | **.556** | **.500** | — | 2.0 | 2.0 | .0 | **1.0** | 12.0 |
| 2024 | Miami | 5 | **5** | **37.0** | .385 | .349 | .900 | 3.6 | **5.4** | .4 | .0 | 16.8 |
| 2025 | Miami | 4 | 4 | 36.0 | .415 | .310 | .800 | 3.5 | 2.8 | .5 | .0 | **17.8** |
| Career | | 50 | 15 | 30.6 | .414 | .328 | .889 | 4.2 | 3.3 | .4 | .2 | 14.6 |

=== College ===
| Year | Team | GP | GS | MPG | FG% | 3P% | FT% | RPG | APG | SPG | BPG | PPG |
|---|---|---|---|---|---|---|---|---|---|---|---|---|
| 2018–19 | Kentucky | 37 | 37 | 32.6 | .462 | .355 | .935 | 4.5 | 2.5 | 1.1 | .3 | 14.0 |

=== Records ===
==== Miami Heat ====
===== Regular season =====
- Single-season free throw percentage (93.4%, 2022–23)

===== Playoffs =====
- Most 3-point shots made in a playoff game quarter (4; September 19, 2020), tied with several including Damon Jones (April 25, 2005), Duncan Robinson (September, 17 2020, April 17 & May 23, 2022, April 19, 2023), Dwyane Wade (April 25, 2010), Max Strus (June 4, 2023) and Luol Deng (April 23, 2016), possibly others before 2015 playoffs.
- Most 3-point shots made in an overtime game (2)

== Personal life ==
Herro has two younger brothers, Austin and Myles, both of whom also play basketball. His parents are Jennifer and Chris Herro.

Herro was included in the Jack Harlow song "Tyler Herro" named after himself, and features prominently in the music video. In turn, Herro also portrayed himself in the White Men Can't Jump remake starring Harlow.

In 2020, Herro began dating Katya Elise Henry. On June 5, 2021, they announced that they were expecting a child. Their daughter was born on September 14, 2021. On June 18, 2022, the couple announced that they were expecting a second child. Their son was born on January 12, 2023. Tyler and Katya split up in September 2026.

In a June 2025 livestream, Herro stated that he didn't "believe in history." He specifically denied Christopher Columbus' landing in America, Wilt Chamberlain's 100-point game, and the moon landing.

== See also ==
- List of NBA annual free throw percentage leaders
