= 2022–23 Miami Heat season =

2022–23 NBA season by team

- Conference champions
- Division champions
- Head coach: Erik Spoelstra
- President: Pat Riley
- General manager: Andy Elisburg
- Owner: Micky Arison
- Arena: Kaseya Center (Note: Formerly known as the FTX Arena until January 12, 2023 and the Miami-Dade Arena from January 12, 2023 to April 4, 2023)

Results
- Record: 44–38 (.537)
- Place: Division: 1st (Southeast); Conference: 7th (Eastern)
- Playoff finish: NBA Finals (lost to Nuggets 1–4)
- Stats at Basketball Reference

Local media
- Television: Bally Sports Sun
- Radio: WQAM

The 2022–23 Miami Heat season was the 35th season for the franchise in the National Basketball Association (NBA). On April 7, the Heat clinched the title in the Southeast Division with a win over the Philadelphia 76ers.

The Heat regressed from their 53–29 record from the prior season, when they clinched the top seed in the Eastern Conference. Despite finishing the regular season seventh, the team repeated as Southeast Division champions (they were the only team in the division with a winning record). Miami clinched the eighth seed in the playoffs following a loss to the eighth-seeded Atlanta Hawks and a win over the 10th-seeded Chicago Bulls in the play-in tournament.

On January 10, 2023, the team set an NBA record by shooting 40–40 on their free throws during a one-point home victory over the Oklahoma City Thunder.

In the first round, the Heat eliminated the top-seeded Milwaukee Bucks in five games, becoming just the sixth eighth-seeded team to defeat a first seed in NBA history in what is regarded by some to be one of the biggest upsets in NBA playoff history. They also become the first play-in team in NBA history to win a playoff series.

With a Game 6 win over the New York Knicks, the Heat became only the second eighth-seeded team to make it to the Conference Finals since the eighth-seed's implementation in 1984, the first being the 1998–99 New York Knicks, who coincidentally won over the Heat. They also became the first play-in team to make the Conference Finals. They also qualified for back–to–back Conference Finals appearances for the first time since 2013 and 2014.

The Heat avoided blowing a 3–0 lead to the Boston Celtics in the Conference Finals with a 103–84 Game 7 win on May 29, 2023, becoming the first eighth-seeded NBA team to reach the NBA Finals since the 1999 New York Knicks. They would later break that Knicks team record for wins in a postseason by an 8-seed by notching their 13th victory of the 2023 playoffs when they won Game 2 of the 2023 NBA Finals against the Denver Nuggets. The defeat of Boston earned Miami their seventh overall Eastern Conference championship, their sixth trip to the NBA Finals in the last thirteen seasons, and their second NBA Finals appearance since 2020. The Heat's season ended in a Finals loss to a former ABA team that won its first NBA championship (echoing a similar fate suffered by the 1999 Knicks, when the San Antonio Spurs began their run of five championships through the next 15 years). One night later, the Florida Panthers lost the Stanley Cup Final to the Vegas Golden Knights; that series also ended in five games, and in the winner's home arena, giving the South Florida region the rare distinction of having two different teams lose the finals of their respective sport on consecutive days.

Off the court, the Heat gained notoriety after the naming rights sponsor of its arena filed for bankruptcy in November. This led to the venue being renamed twice during the season, first as the Miami-Dade Arena before the naming rights were sold again to Miami-based software company Kaseya, resulting in the arena being renamed the Kaseya Center.

After the season ended Udonis Haslem retired from the NBA after 20 seasons with the Heat.

== Draft ==
Round	Pick	Player	Position(s)	Nationality	College / Club
1	27	Nikola Jović	SF	Serbia	Mega Mozzart (Serbia)

The Heat own their first round pick. They initially had a second-round pick which was forfeited due to tampering violations with respect to Kyle Lowry and free agency in 2021.

== Roster ==
2022–23 Miami Heat roster
Players

Pos.	No.	Player	Height	Weight	DOB	From
F/C	13	Bam Adebayo	6 ft 9 in (2.06 m)	255 lb (116 kg)	1997-07-18	Kentucky
F	22	Jimmy Butler	6 ft 7 in (2.01 m)	230 lb (104 kg)	1989-09-14	Marquette
F	8	Jamal Cain (TW)	6 ft 7 in (2.01 m)	191 lb (87 kg)	1999-03-20	Oakland
F/C	40	Udonis Haslem	6 ft 7 in (2.01 m)	235 lb (107 kg)	1980-06-09	Florida
G	14	Tyler Herro	6 ft 5 in (1.96 m)	195 lb (88 kg)	2000-01-20	Kentucky
F	24	Haywood Highsmith	6 ft 5 in (1.96 m)	220 lb (100 kg)	1996-12-09	Wheeling
F	5	Nikola Jović	6 ft 10 in (2.08 m)	205 lb (93 kg)	2003-06-09	Serbia
F/C	42	Kevin Love	6 ft 8 in (2.03 m)	251 lb (114 kg)	1988-09-07	UCLA
G	7	Kyle Lowry	6 ft 0 in (1.83 m)	196 lb (89 kg)	1986-03-25	Villanova
F	16	Caleb Martin	6 ft 5 in (1.96 m)	205 lb (93 kg)	1995-09-28	Nevada
G	4	Victor Oladipo	6 ft 3 in (1.91 m)	213 lb (97 kg)	1992-05-04	Indiana
G/F	55	Duncan Robinson	6 ft 7 in (2.01 m)	215 lb (98 kg)	1994-04-22	Michigan
F/C	25	Orlando Robinson (TW)	6 ft 10 in (2.08 m)	235 lb (107 kg)	2000-07-10	Fresno State
G/F	31	Max Strus	6 ft 5 in (1.96 m)	215 lb (98 kg)	1996-03-28	DePaul
G	2	Gabe Vincent	6 ft 2 in (1.88 m)	200 lb (91 kg)	1996-06-14	UC Santa Barbara
C	77	Ömer Yurtseven	6 ft 11 in (2.11 m)	275 lb (125 kg)	1998-06-19	Georgetown
F/C	44	Cody Zeller	6 ft 11 in (2.11 m)	240 lb (109 kg)	1992-10-05	Indiana

Coaches
Head coach
- Erik Spoelstra
Assistant(s)
- Malik Allen
- Caron Butler
- Anthony Carter
- Octavio De La Grana
- Eric Glass
- Chris Quinn

Legend
- (DP) Unsigned draft pick
- (FA) Free agent
- (S) Suspended
- (GL) On assignment to G League affiliate
- (TW) Two-way affiliate player
- Injured

Roster
Updated: March 18, 2023

== Standings ==
=== Division ===
Southeast Division	W	L	PCT	GB	Home	Road	Div	GP
y – Miami Heat	44	38	.537	–	27‍–‍14	17‍–‍24	10–6	82
x – Atlanta Hawks	41	41	.500	3.0	24‍–‍17	17‍–‍24	8–8	82
Washington Wizards	35	47	.427	9.0	19‍–‍22	16‍–‍25	8–8	82
Orlando Magic	34	48	.415	10.0	20‍–‍21	14‍–‍27	7–9	82
Charlotte Hornets	27	55	.329	17.0	13‍–‍28	14‍–‍27	7–9	82

=== Conference ===
Eastern Conference
#	Team	W	L	PCT	GB	GP
1	z – Milwaukee Bucks *	58	24	.707	–	82
2	y – Boston Celtics *	57	25	.695	1.0	82
3	x – Philadelphia 76ers	54	28	.659	4.0	82
4	x – Cleveland Cavaliers	51	31	.622	7.0	82
5	x – New York Knicks	47	35	.573	11.0	82
6	x – Brooklyn Nets	45	37	.549	13.0	82
7	y – Miami Heat *	44	38	.537	14.0	82
8	x – Atlanta Hawks	41	41	.500	17.0	82
9	pi – Toronto Raptors	41	41	.500	17.0	82
10	pi – Chicago Bulls	40	42	.488	18.0	82
11	Indiana Pacers	35	47	.427	23.0	82
12	Washington Wizards	35	47	.427	23.0	82
13	Orlando Magic	34	48	.415	24.0	82
14	Charlotte Hornets	27	55	.329	31.0	82
15	Detroit Pistons	17	65	.207	41.0	82

== Game log ==
=== Preseason ===
2022 preseason game log
Total: 4–1 (Home: 2–1; Road: 2–0)
Preseason: 4–1 (home: 2–1; road: 2–0)

Game	Date	Team	Score	High points	High rebounds	High assists	Location Attendance	Record
1	October 4	Minnesota	L 111–121	Adebayo, Herro (22)	Ömer Yurtseven (9)	Herro, Strus (4)	FTX Arena; 19,600	0–1
2	October 6	@ Brooklyn	W 109–80	Bam Adebayo (17)	Jamal Cain (11)	Highsmith, Jović (5)	Barclays Center; 14,058	1–1
3	October 7	@ Memphis	W 111–108	Duncan Robinson (29)	Nikola Jović (8)	Jamaree Bouyea (8)	FedExForum; 14,395	2–1
4	October 10	Houston	W 118–110	Max Strus (24)	Nikola Jović (12)	Jović, Oladipo, Robinson, Vincent (4)	FTX Arena; 19,600	3–1
5	October 12	New Orleans	W 120–103	Bam Adebayo (23)	Kyle Lowry (9)	Jimmy Butler (6)	FTX Arena; 19,600	4–1

2022–23 preseason schedule

=== Regular season ===
2022–23 game log
Total: 44–38 (Home: 27–14; Road: 17–24)
October: 2–5 (home: 1–3; road: 1–2)

Game	Date	Team	Score	High points	High rebounds	High assists	Location Attendance	Record
1	October 19	Chicago	L 108–116	Jimmy Butler (24)	Bam Adebayo (9)	Kyle Lowry (4)	FTX Arena; 19,600	0–1
2	October 21	Boston	L 104–111	Tyler Herro (25)	Bam Adebayo (8)	Kyle Lowry (6)	FTX Arena; 19,600	0–2
3	October 22	Toronto	W 112–109	Jimmy Butler (24)	Tyler Herro (8)	Herro, Lowry (6)	FTX Arena; 19,600	1–2
4	October 24	Toronto	L 90–98	Jimmy Butler (26)	Tyler Herro (15)	Butler, Herro, Vincent (4)	FTX Arena; 19,600	1–3
5	October 26	@ Portland	W 119–98	Bam Adebayo (18)	Max Strus (9)	Gabe Vincent (7)	Moda Center; 18,578	2–3
6	October 27	@ Golden State	L 110–123	Jimmy Butler (27)	Bam Adebayo (8)	Butler, Lowry (8)	Chase Center; 18,064	2–4
7	October 29	@ Sacramento	L 113–119	Tyler Herro (34)	Jimmy Butler (7)	Jimmy Butler (6)	Golden 1 Center; 14,618	2–5

November: 8–7 (home: 7–1; road: 1–6)

Game	Date	Team	Score	High points	High rebounds	High assists	Location Attendance	Record
8	November 1	Golden State	W 116–109	Max Strus (24)	Gabe Vincent (8)	Kyle Lowry (9)	FTX Arena; 19,600	3–5
9	November 2	Sacramento	W 110–107	Tyler Herro (26)	Tyler Herro (12)	Kyle Lowry (7)	FTX Arena; 19,600	4–5
10	November 4	@ Indiana	L 99–101	Tyler Herro (29)	Bam Adebayo (10)	Tyler Herro (5)	Gainbridge Fieldhouse; 13,141	4–6
11	November 7	Portland	L 107–110	Adebayo, Butler, Strus (16)	Kyle Lowry (7)	Kyle Lowry (8)	FTX Arena; 19,600	4–7
12	November 10	Charlotte	W 117–112	Jimmy Butler (35)	Jimmy Butler (10)	Jimmy Butler (8)	FTX Arena; 19,600	5–7
13	November 12	Charlotte	W 132–115	Max Strus (31)	Bam Adebayo (15)	Butler, Lowry (8)	FTX Arena; 19,600	6–7
14	November 14	Phoenix	W 113–112	Bam Adebayo (30)	Jimmy Butler (13)	Jimmy Butler (7)	FTX Arena; 19,600	7–7
15	November 16	@ Toronto	L 104–112	Max Strus (20)	Caleb Martin (9)	Butler, Vincent (5)	Scotiabank Arena; 19,800	7–8
16	November 18	@ Washington	L 106–107 (OT)	Kyle Lowry (24)	Haywood Highsmith (13)	Kyle Lowry (15)	Capital One Arena; 18,772	7–9
17	November 20	@ Cleveland	L 87–113	Bam Adebayo (21)	Bam Adebayo (6)	Nikola Jović (5)	Rocket Mortgage FieldHouse; 19,432	7–10
18	November 21	@ Minnesota	L 101–105	Kyle Lowry (21)	Bam Adebayo (14)	Kyle Lowry (9)	Target Center; 16,583	7–11
19	November 23	Washington	W 113–105	Kyle Lowry (28)	Bam Adebayo (11)	Martin, Vincent (4)	FTX Arena; 19,600	8–11
20	November 25	Washington	W 110–107	Bam Adebayo (38)	Bam Adebayo (12)	Tyler Herro (10)	FTX Arena; 19,600	9–11
21	November 27	@ Atlanta	W 106–98	Bam Adebayo (32)	Tyler Herro (11)	Tyler Herro (10)	State Farm Arena; 17,268	10–11
22	November 30	@ Boston	L 121–134	Adebayo, Strus (23)	Haywood Highsmith (8)	Tyler Herro (9)	TD Garden; 19,156	10–12

December: 9–6 (home: 3–4; road: 6–2)

Game	Date	Team	Score	High points	High rebounds	High assists	Location Attendance	Record
23	December 2	@ Boston	W 120–116 (OT)	Bam Adebayo (28)	Jimmy Butler (15)	Lowry, Vincent (4)	TD Garden; 19,156	11–12
24	December 5	@ Memphis	L 93–101	Tyler Herro (28)	Tyler Herro (13)	Jimmy Butler (8)	FedExForum; 16,122	11–13
25	December 6	Detroit	L 96–116	Tyler Herro (34)	Bam Adebayo (15)	Herro, Lowry (6)	FTX Arena; 19,600	11–14
26	December 8	L.A. Clippers	W 115–110	Bam Adebayo (31)	Bam Adebayo (10)	Jimmy Butler (8)	FTX Arena; 19,600	12–14
26	December 10	San Antonio	L 111–115	Jimmy Butler (30)	Bam Adebayo (9)	Kyle Lowry (7)	FTX Arena; 19,600	12–15
27	December 12	@ Indiana	W 87–82	Bam Adebayo (22)	Bam Adebayo (17)	Tyler Herro (6)	Gainbridge Fieldhouse; 15,309	13–15
28	December 14	@ Oklahoma City	W 110–108	Tyler Herro (35)	Bam Adebayo (13)	Kyle Lowry (6)	Paycom Center; 14,783	14–15
30	December 15	@ Houston	W 111–108	Tyler Herro (41)	Jimmy Butler (10)	Jimmy Butler (7)	Toyota Center; 16,210	15–15
31	December 17	@ San Antonio	W 111–101	Jimmy Butler (26)	Bam Adebayo (13)	Tyler Herro (7)	Mexico City Arena; 20,160	16–15
32	December 20	Chicago	L 103–113	Bam Adebayo (27)	Bam Adebayo (12)	Tyler Herro (7)	FTX Arena; 19,969	16–16
33	December 23	Indiana	L 108–111	Tyler Herro (28)	Bam Adebayo (7)	Kyle Lowry (5)	FTX Arena; 19,600	16–17
34	December 26	Minnesota	W 113–110	Max Strus (19)	Orlando Robinson (9)	Kyle Lowry (9)	FTX Arena; 19,911	17–17
35	December 28	L.A. Lakers	W 112–98	Jimmy Butler (27)	Bam Adebayo (14)	Tyler Herro (9)	FTX Arena; 20,221	18–17
36	December 30	@ Denver	L 119–124	Tyler Herro (26)	Tyler Herro (10)	Jimmy Butler (8)	Ball Arena; 19,638	18–18
37	December 31	@ Utah	W 126–123	Bam Adebayo (32)	Tyler Herro (9)	Herro, Strus (6)	Vivint Arena; 18,206	19–18

January: 10–5 (home: 6–1; road: 4–4)

Game	Date	Team	Score	High points	High rebounds	High assists	Location Attendance	Record
38	January 2	@ L.A. Clippers	W 110–100	Bam Adebayo (31)	Bam Adebayo (13)	Jimmy Butler (6)	Crypto.com Arena; 19,068	20–18
39	January 4	@ L.A. Lakers	L 109–112	Bam Adebayo (30)	Bam Adebayo (13)	Victor Oladipo (5)	Crypto.com Arena; 18,997	20–19
40	January 6	@ Phoenix	W 104–96	Victor Oladipo (26)	Bam Adebayo (11)	Jimmy Butler (6)	Footprint Center; 17,071	21–19
41	January 8	Brooklyn	L 101–102	Jimmy Butler (26)	Orlando Robinson (9)	Victor Oladipo (6)	FTX Arena; 19,901	21–20
42	January 10	Oklahoma City	W 112–111	Jimmy Butler (35)	Butler, Strus (7)	Butler, Oladipo, Vincent (4)	FTX Arena; 19,600	22–20
43	January 12	Milwaukee	W 108–102	Gabe Vincent (28)	Bam Adebayo (12)	Victor Oladipo (8)	FTX Arena; 19,600	23–20
44	January 14	Milwaukee	W 111–95	Gabe Vincent (27)	Bam Adebayo (13)	Victor Oladipo (5)	Miami-Dade Arena; 19,620	24–20
45	January 16	@ Atlanta	L 113–121	Jimmy Butler (34)	Bam Adebayo (13)	Victor Oladipo (10)	State Farm Arena; 18,007	24–21
46	January 18	@ New Orleans	W 124–98	Bam Adebayo (26)	Adebayo, Lowry (8)	Max Strus (10)	Smoothie King Center; 17,736	25–21
47	January 20	@ Dallas	L 90–115	Victor Oladipo (20)	Bam Adebayo (11)	Bam Adebayo (4)	American Airlines Center; 20,326	25–22
48	January 22	New Orleans	W 100–96	Tyler Herro (26)	Bam Adebayo (9)	Victor Oladipo (5)	Miami-Dade Arena; 19,600	26–22
49	January 24	Boston	W 98–95	Bam Adebayo (30)	Bam Adebayo (15)	Kyle Lowry (8)	Miami-Dade Arena; 19,705	27–22
50	January 27	Orlando	W 110–105	Jimmy Butler (29)	Caleb Martin (7)	Bam Adebayo (7)	Miami-Dade Arena; 19,788	28–22
51	January 29	@ Charlotte	L 117–122	Jimmy Butler (28)	Jimmy Butler (7)	Bam Adebayo (6)	Spectrum Center; 19,254	28–23
52	January 31	@ Cleveland	W 100–97	Jimmy Butler (23)	Bam Adebayo (11)	Victor Oladipo (6)	Rocket Mortgage FieldHouse; 19,432	29–23

February: 4–6 (home: 2–1; road: 2–5)

Game	Date	Team	Score	High points	High rebounds	High assists	Location Attendance	Record
53	February 2	@ New York	L 104–106	Bam Adebayo (32)	Bam Adebayo (9)	Tyler Herro (8)	Madison Square Garden; 19,044	29–24
54	February 4	@ Milwaukee	L 115–123	Jimmy Butler (32)	Bam Adebayo (11)	Bam Adebayo (8)	Fiserv Forum; 18,008	29–25
55	February 8	Indiana	W 116–111	Bam Adebayo (38)	Caleb Martin (11)	Jimmy Butler (7)	Miami-Dade Arena; 19,600	30–25
56	February 10	Houston	W 97–95	Tyler Herro (31)	Adebayo, Herro, Martin (9)	Tyler Herro (8)	Miami-Dade Arena; 19,600	31–25
57	February 11	@ Orlando	W 107–103	Tyler Herro (23)	Bam Adebayo (17)	Max Strus (7)	Amway Center; 18,223	32–25
58	February 13	Denver	L 108–112	Jimmy Butler (24)	Jimmy Butler (10)	Jimmy Butler (9)	Miami-Dade Arena; 19,755	32–26
59	February 15	@ Brooklyn	L 105–116	Bam Adebayo (24)	Bam Adebayo (13)	Adebayo, Butler (6)	Barclays Center; 17,963	32–27
60	February 24	@ Milwaukee	L 99–128	Jimmy Butler (23)	Kevin Love (8)	Love, Strus (4)	Fiserv Forum; 17,676	32–28
61	February 25	@ Charlotte	L 103–108	Tyler Herro (33)	Kevin Love (13)	Jimmy Butler (6)	Spectrum Center; 19,109	32–29
62	February 27	@ Philadelphia	W 101–99	Jimmy Butler (23)	Jimmy Butler (11)	Jimmy Butler (9)	Wells Fargo Center; 20,859	33–29

March: 7–8 (home: 6–4; road: 1–4)

Game	Date	Team	Score	High points	High rebounds	High assists	Location Attendance	Record
63	March 1	Philadelphia	L 96–119	Bam Adebayo (20)	Bam Adebayo (8)	Tyler Herro (6)	Miami-Dade Arena; 19,600	33–30
64	March 3	New York	L 120–122	Jimmy Butler (33)	Butler, Herro, Love (8)	Tyler Herro (6)	Miami-Dade Arena; 19,600	33–31
65	March 4	Atlanta	W 117–109	Bam Adebayo (30)	Adebayo, Butler (11)	Jimmy Butler (7)	Miami-Dade Arena; 19,600	34–31
66	March 6	Atlanta	W 130–128	Jimmy Butler (26)	Jimmy Butler (9)	Jimmy Butler (9)	Miami-Dade Arena; 19,600	35–31
67	March 8	Cleveland	L 100–104	Jimmy Butler (28)	Love, Zeller (8)	Butler, Herro (5)	Miami-Dade Arena; 19,600	35–32
68	March 10	Cleveland	W 119–115	Jimmy Butler (33)	Tyler Herro (9)	Adebayo, Herro (4)	Miami-Dade Arena; 19,757	36–32
69	March 11	@ Orlando	L 114–126 (OT)	Jimmy Butler (38)	Bam Adebayo (7)	Kyle Lowry (4)	Amway Center; 17,347	36–33
70	March 13	Utah	W 119–115	Jimmy Butler (24)	Bam Adebayo (9)	Butler, Lowry (4)	Miami-Dade Arena; 19,721	37–33
71	March 15	Memphis	W 138–119	Bam Adebayo (26)	Adebayo, Butler (8)	Butler, Herro, Strus (6)	Miami-Dade Arena; 19,794	38–33
72	March 18	@ Chicago	L 99–113	Jimmy Butler (24)	Adebayo, Butler, Herro (7)	Adebayo, Strus, Vincent (4)	United Center; 20,094	38–34
73	March 19	@ Detroit	W 112–100	Jimmy Butler (26)	Bam Adebayo (10)	Jimmy Butler (10)	Little Caesars Arena; 20,190	39–34
74	March 22	New York	W 127–120	Jimmy Butler (35)	Bam Adebayo (7)	Jimmy Butler (9)	Miami-Dade Arena; 19,863	40–34
75	March 25	Brooklyn	L 100–129	Herro, Strus (23)	Caleb Martin (9)	Jimmy Butler (5)	Miami-Dade Arena; 19,680	40–35
76	March 28	@ Toronto	L 92–106	Tyler Herro (33)	Bam Adebayo (12)	Tyler Herro (6)	Scotiabank Arena; 19,800	40–36
77	March 29	@ New York	L 92–101	Gabe Vincent (21)	Bam Adebayo (11)	Jimmy Butler (6)	Madison Square Garden; 19,812	40–37

April: 4–1 (home: 2–0; road: 2–1)

Game	Date	Team	Score	High points	High rebounds	High assists	Location Attendance	Record
78	April 1	Dallas	W 129–122	Jimmy Butler (35)	Cody Zeller (8)	Jimmy Butler (12)	Miami-Dade Arena; 20,011	41–37
79	April 4	@ Detroit	W 118–105	Jimmy Butler (27)	Jimmy Butler (8)	Jimmy Butler (8)	Little Caesars Arena; 18,453	42–37
80	April 6	@ Philadelphia	W 129–101	Butler, Herro (24)	Bam Adebayo (8)	Kyle Lowry (7)	Wells Fargo Center; 21,178	43–37
81	April 7	@ Washington	L 108–114	Victor Oladipo (30)	Haywood Highsmith (9)	Gabe Vincent (8)	Capital One Arena; 20,476	43–38
82	April 9	Orlando	W 123–110	Udonis Haslem (24)	Ömer Yurtseven (7)	Victor Oladipo (8)	Kaseya Center; 19,894	44–38

2022–23 season schedule

=== Play-in ===
2023 play-in game log
Total: 1–1 (Home: 1–1; Road: 0–0)
Play-in: 1–1 (home: 1–1; road: 0–0)

Game	Date	Team	Score	High points	High rebounds	High assists	Location Attendance	Record
1	April 11	Atlanta	L 105–116	Kyle Lowry (33)	Bam Adebayo (9)	Jimmy Butler (9)	Kaseya Center; 19,662	0–1
2	April 14	Chicago	W 102–91	Butler, Strus (31)	Bam Adebayo (17)	Tyler Herro (7)	Kaseya Center; 19,678	1–1

2022–23 season schedule

=== Playoffs ===
2023 playoff game log
Total: 13–10 (Home: 6–4; Road: 7–6)
First Round: 4–1 (home: 2–0; road: 2–1)

Game	Date	Team	Score	High points	High rebounds	High assists	Location Attendance	Series
1	April 16	@ Milwaukee	W 130–117	Jimmy Butler (35)	Bam Adebayo (9)	Jimmy Butler (11)	Fiserv Forum; 17,381	1–0
2	April 19	@ Milwaukee	L 122–138	Jimmy Butler (25)	Cody Zeller (8)	Caleb Martin (6)	Fiserv Forum; 17,576	1–1
3	April 22	Milwaukee	W 121–99	Jimmy Butler (30)	Adebayo, Martin (11)	Bam Adebayo (5)	Kaseya Center; 19,734	2–1
4	April 24	Milwaukee	W 119–114	Jimmy Butler (56)	Butler, Martin (9)	Gabe Vincent (8)	Kaseya Center; 19,614	3–1
5	April 26	@ Milwaukee	W 128–126 (OT)	Jimmy Butler (42)	Kevin Love (12)	Bam Adebayo (10)	Fiserv Forum; 18,113	4–1

Conference Semifinals: 4–2 (home: 3–0; road: 1–2)

Game	Date	Team	Score	High points	High rebounds	High assists	Location Attendance	Series
1	April 30	@ New York	W 108–101	Jimmy Butler (25)	Jimmy Butler (11)	Kyle Lowry (6)	Madison Square Garden; 19,812	1–0
2	May 2	@ New York	L 105–111	Caleb Martin (22)	Adebayo, Martin (8)	Adebayo, Lowry (6)	Madison Square Garden; 19,812	1–1
3	May 6	New York	W 105–86	Jimmy Butler (28)	Bam Adebayo (12)	Love, Lowry, Vincent (4)	Kaseya Center; 19,927	2–1
4	May 8	New York	W 109–101	Jimmy Butler (27)	Bam Adebayo (13)	Jimmy Butler (10)	Kaseya Center; 19,769	3–1
5	May 10	@ New York	L 103–112	Jimmy Butler (19)	Bam Adebayo (8)	Jimmy Butler (9)	Madison Square Garden; 19,812	3–2
6	May 12	New York	W 96–92	Jimmy Butler (24)	Bam Adebayo (9)	Kyle Lowry (9)	Kaseya Center; 19,737	4–2

Conference Finals: 4–3 (home: 1–2; road: 3–1)

Game	Date	Team	Score	High points	High rebounds	High assists	Location Attendance	Series
1	May 17	@ Boston	W 123–116	Jimmy Butler (35)	Bam Adebayo (8)	Jimmy Butler (7)	TD Garden; 19,156	1–0
2	May 19	@ Boston	W 111–105	Jimmy Butler (27)	Bam Adebayo (17)	Bam Adebayo (9)	TD Garden; 19,156	2–0
3	May 21	Boston	W 128–102	Gabe Vincent (29)	Jimmy Butler (8)	Jimmy Butler (6)	Kaseya Center; 20,088	3–0
4	May 23	Boston	L 99–116	Jimmy Butler (29)	Jimmy Butler (9)	Kyle Lowry (6)	Kaseya Center; 20,147	3–1
5	May 25	@ Boston	L 97–110	Duncan Robinson (18)	Bam Adebayo (8)	Duncan Robinson (9)	TD Garden; 19,156	3–2
6	May 27	Boston	L 103–104	Jimmy Butler (24)	Caleb Martin (15)	Jimmy Butler (8)	Kaseya Center; 20,201	3–3
7	May 29	@ Boston	W 103–84	Jimmy Butler (28)	Caleb Martin (10)	Bam Adebayo (7)	TD Garden; 19,156	4–3

NBA Finals: 1–4 (home: 0–2; road: 1–2)

Game	Date	Team	Score	High points	High rebounds	High assists	Location Attendance	Series
1	June 1	@ Denver	L 93–104	Bam Adebayo (26)	Bam Adebayo (13)	Jimmy Butler (7)	Ball Arena; 19,528	0–1
2	June 4	@ Denver	W 111–108	Gabe Vincent (23)	Kevin Love (10)	Jimmy Butler (9)	Ball Arena; 19,537	1–1
3	June 7	Denver	L 94–109	Jimmy Butler (28)	Bam Adebayo (17)	Lowry, Strus (5)	Kaseya Center; 20,019	1–2
4	June 9	Denver	L 95–108	Jimmy Butler (25)	Bam Adebayo (11)	Butler, Lowry (7)	Kaseya Center; 20,184	1–3
5	June 12	@ Denver	L 89–94	Jimmy Butler (21)	Bam Adebayo (12)	Jimmy Butler (5)	Ball Arena; 19,537	1–4

2023 playoff schedule

== Player statistics ==
=== Regular season ===
Player	POS	GP	GS	MP	REB	AST	STL	BLK	PTS	MPG	RPG	APG	SPG	BPG	PPG
Max Strus	SF	80	33	2,272	258	171	42	12	923	28.4	3.2	2.1	.5	.2	11.5
Bam Adebayo	C	75	75	2,598	688	240	88	61	1,529	34.6	9.2	3.2	1.2	.8	20.4
Caleb Martin	SF	71	49	2,077	344	117	71	31	683	29.3	4.8	1.6	1.0	.4	9.6
Gabe Vincent	PG	68	34	1,759	145	167	62	5	641	25.9	2.1	2.5	.9	.1	9.4
Tyler Herro	SG	67	67	2,337	360	280	51	16	1,347	34.9	5.4	4.2	.8	.2	20.1
Jimmy Butler	PF	64	64	2,138	375	340	117	21	1,466	33.4	5.9	5.3	1.8	.3	22.9
Kyle Lowry	PG	55	44	1,718	225	281	57	21	615	31.2	4.1	5.1	1.0	.4	11.2
Haywood Highsmith	PF	54	11	969	188	43	36	17	236	17.9	3.5	.8	.7	.3	4.4
Victor Oladipo	SG	42	2	1,106	128	146	57	12	449	26.3	3.0	3.5	1.4	.3	10.7
Duncan Robinson	SF	42	1	691	69	46	14	0	268	16.5	1.6	1.1	.3	.0	6.4
Orlando Robinson	C	31	1	425	126	25	12	12	116	13.7	4.1	.8	.4	.4	3.7
Dewayne Dedmon^{†}	C	30	0	350	109	16	7	14	171	11.7	3.6	.5	.2	.5	5.7
Kevin Love^{†}	PF	21	17	419	119	40	9	5	162	20.0	5.7	1.9	.4	.2	7.7
Jamal Cain	PF	18	0	240	52	12	11	1	98	13.3	2.9	.7	.6	.1	5.4
Nikola Jović	PF	15	8	204	31	10	7	2	82	13.6	2.1	.7	.5	.1	5.5
Cody Zeller	C	15	2	217	64	10	3	4	98	14.5	4.3	.7	.2	.3	6.5
Ömer Yurtseven	C	9	0	83	23	2	2	2	40	9.2	2.6	.2	.2	.2	4.4
Udonis Haslem	C	7	1	71	11	0	1	2	27	10.1	1.6	.0	.1	.3	3.9
Dru Smith^{†}	SG	5	1	67	9	5	4	3	11	13.4	1.8	1.0	.8	.6	2.2
Jamaree Bouyea^{†}	PG	4	0	65	5	4	4	2	15	16.3	1.3	1.0	1.0	.5	3.8

- ^{†} Denotes player spent time with another team in the season. Stats reflect time with the Heat only.

=== Playoffs ===
Player	POS	GP	GS	MP	REB	AST	STL	BLK	PTS	MPG	RPG	APG	SPG	BPG	PPG
Bam Adebayo	C	23	23	850	227	85	20	15	412	37.0	9.9	3.7	.9	.7	17.9
Max Strus	SF	23	23	648	83	33	8	7	215	28.2	3.6	1.4	.3	.3	9.3
Caleb Martin	SF	23	4	694	125	36	20	9	291	30.2	5.4	1.6	.9	.4	12.7
Kyle Lowry	PG	23	1	599	81	101	24	14	212	26.0	3.5	4.4	1.0	.6	9.2
Duncan Robinson	SF	23	1	418	34	39	8	3	207	18.2	1.5	1.7	.3	.1	9.0
Jimmy Butler	PF	22	22	874	142	129	40	14	592	39.7	6.5	5.9	1.8	.6	26.9
Gabe Vincent	PG	22	22	672	31	78	19	4	279	30.5	1.4	3.5	.9	.2	12.7
Cody Zeller	C	21	0	174	48	7	2	4	46	8.3	2.3	.3	.1	.2	2.2
Kevin Love	PF	20	18	359	111	24	9	7	137	18.0	5.6	1.2	.5	.4	6.9
Haywood Highsmith	PF	18	0	161	24	5	10	2	60	8.9	1.3	.3	.6	.1	3.3
Ömer Yurtseven	C	8	0	16	5	1	0	1	4	2.0	.6	.1	.0	.1	.5
Nikola Jović	PF	7	0	13	5	0	0	0	2	1.9	.7	.0	.0	.0	.3
Victor Oladipo	SG	2	0	45	7	2	2	1	23	22.5	3.5	1.0	1.0	.5	11.5
Udonis Haslem	C	2	0	3	1	0	0	0	0	1.5	.5	.0	.0	.0	.0
Tyler Herro	SG	1	1	19	2	2	0	1	12	19.0	2.0	2.0	.0	1.0	12.0

== Transactions ==
=== Trades ===
February 7, 2023	To Miami Heat Cash considerations	To San Antonio Spurs Dewayne Dedmon; 2028 MIA second-round pick

=== Free agency ===
==== Re-signed ====
Date	Player	Ref.
July 6	Dewayne Dedmon	
July 6	Caleb Martin	
July 7	Victor Oladipo	
August 23	Udonis Haslem	

==== Additions ====
Date	Player	Former team	Ref.
July 7	Orlando Robinson	Fresno State	
July 14	Jamaree Bouyea	San Francisco	
July 15	Jamal Cain	Oakland	
February 20	Cody Zeller	Portland Trail Blazers	
February 20	Kevin Love	Cleveland Cavaliers	

==== Subtractions ====
Date	Player	Reason left	New team	Ref.
July 6	P. J. Tucker	Free agent	Philadelphia 76ers	
September 7	Markieff Morris	Free agent	Brooklyn Nets	
