= Bigface =

American lifestyle brand

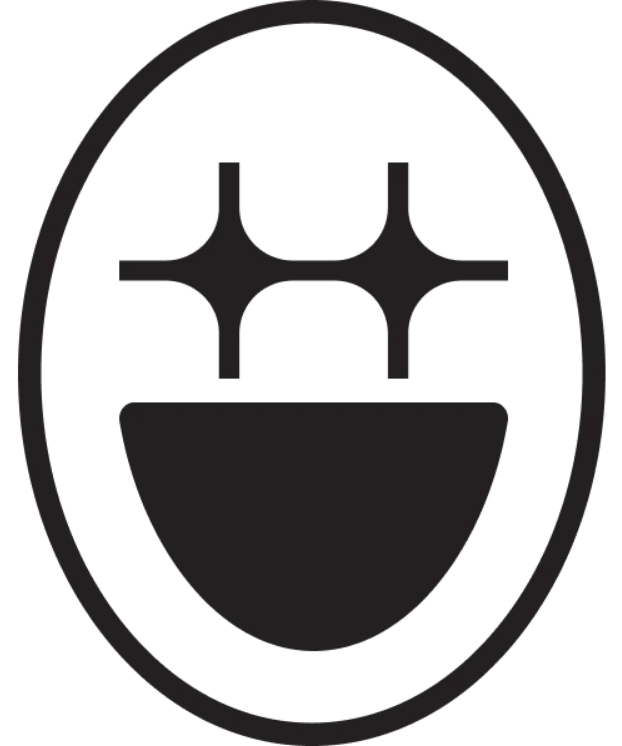
- Industry: Coffee, clothing
- Founded: October 1, 2021; 3 years ago
- Founders: Jimmy Butler
- Headquarters: U.S.
- Products: Coffee beverages; apparel; mugs; tumblers
- Website: www.bigfacebrand.com

Bigface (stylized in all caps and sometimes spelled as Big Face or BigFace) (Note: Listed are sources spelling the company's name as Bigface, Big Face, or BigFace. The all caps stylization is present on the company's official website and used in some third-party sources.) is an American lifestyle brand founded by professional basketball player Jimmy Butler. The company was originally created in 2020 as an informal side business selling coffee to other players while Butler was in the NBA Bubble during the COVID-19 pandemic. After studying the coffee industry further, Butler formally launched Bigface as a coffee company and lifestyle brand the following year, selling direct-to-consumer coffee, apparel, and related merchandise.

== History ==
=== Background and origins as side business ===
Prior to the 2019–20 NBA season, the Miami Heat of the National Basketball Association (NBA) acquired small forward Jimmy Butler from the Philadelphia 76ers in a sign and trade. Due to the onset of the COVID-19 pandemic, the NBA had to suspend their 2019–20 regular season in March. The NBA would later resume the season in July, approving a plan to finish the regular season and host the playoffs in a "bubble" site. The ESPN Wide World of Sports Complex located at Walt Disney World in Bay Lake, Florida, near Orlando was selected as the site. NBA teams' players had to follow safety protocols, including maintaining social distancing. One of the 22 teams who played at the bubble, the Heat were housed at the Destino Tower within the Coronado Springs Resort.

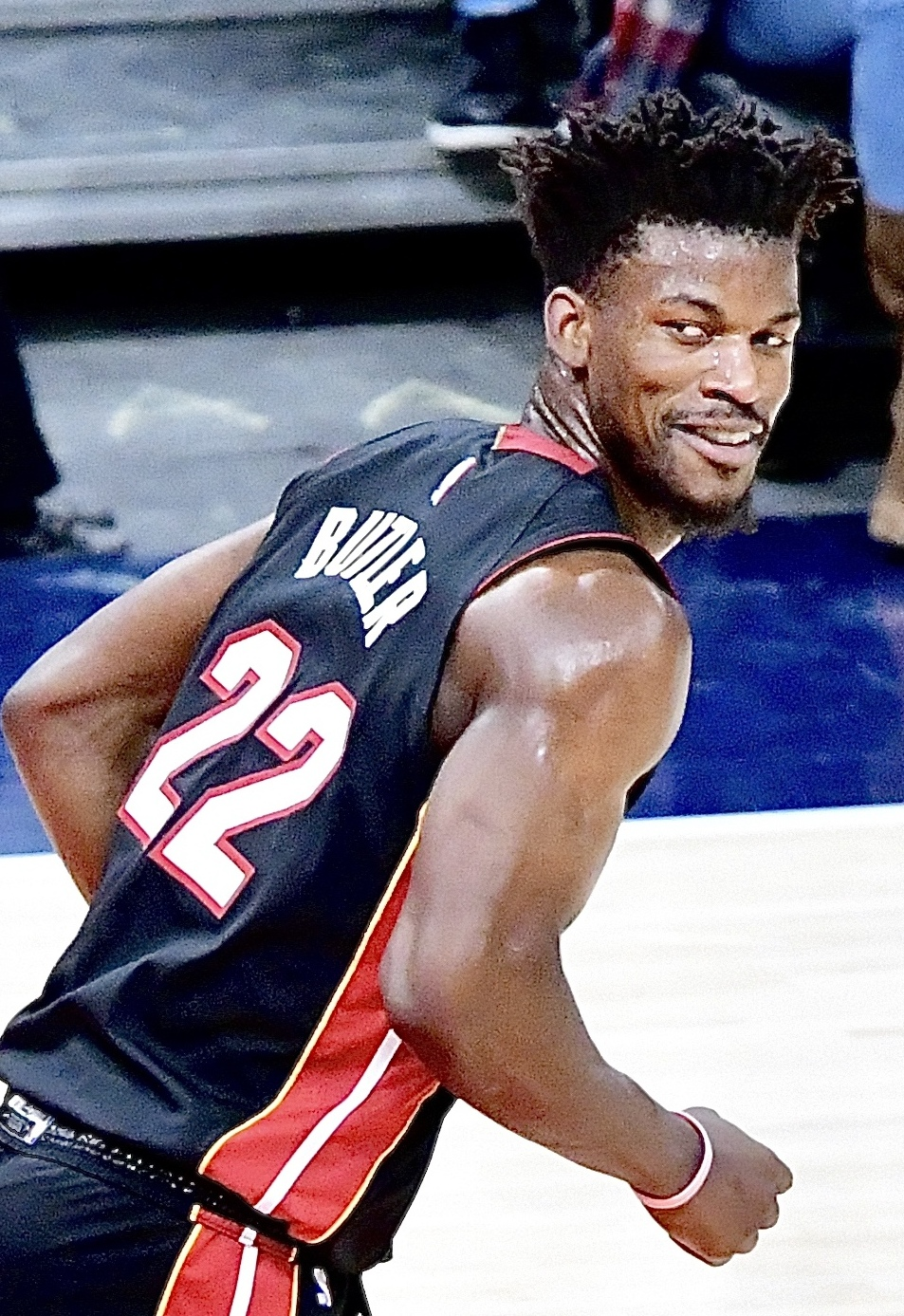
Jimmy Butler in March 2020

When asked about his experience in the bubble in an interview with ESPN's Rachel Nichols, Butler stated "I'm working on my coffee skills. After my career, I'm opening my coffee shop." From there, stories began circulating about Butler's side business selling coffee in the business. Players could bring items from home to use while restricted to stay on location at the bubble site; Butler brought with him a French press. Finding the coffee options at the bubble sub-optimal, Butler began making coffee of his own using the coffee beans from El Salvador. From his room, Butler began selling cups of coffee to his teammates at an upcharge for $20 as a joke. Butler selected this pricing because though cash was largely useless in the bubble—which was mostly empty aside from NBA players, personnel, and reporters—"NBA per diem rules still applied," which saw the league's personnel receiving "envelopes filled with cash like they would to cover meals and incidentals on a regular road trip." Noticing that envelopes (Note: Sources differ on the exact amount of these envelopes, ranging from $1,040 up to $2,400.) included $20 bills, Butler charged the amount knowing most players would have such a bill available to them. He offered the same price for all cup sizes and types of coffee.

Originating as an inside joke, Butler called his business "Big Face Coffee", explaining that he would charge an initial $20 for a cup of coffee, adding that with potential buyers now out of $20 bills, they would then need to use "big faces," slang for $100 bills. Butler added "whenever they hand me the hundred, I'm going to be like, 'Whoops, sorry. I don't have change. Thank you for paying a hundred dollars for a cup of coffee.' Never really worked that way but the idea was genius." Butler contributed the difficulty to find coffee as a reason why demand for his was high.

In September, Butler filed for trademarks relating to "Big Face" and began wearing merchandise before a Miami–Boston playoff game. The Heat's season would end with the 2020 NBA Finals, which they lost to the Los Angeles Lakers, 4–2.

Prior to launching Bigface, Butler was originally not a coffee drinker. In an interview with coffee blog Sprudge, he recalled begrudgingly drinking coffee with his trainer before eventually finding a passion for both the beverage and business related to it.

=== Post-bubble and official company launch ===
Following the season, Butler continued to study coffee-related topics such as beans, temperatures, and techniques. Butler later shared with Insider that he was inspired to enter the coffee business due to connect with strangers over a cup of coffee during the offseasons of his NBA career. Butler has studied and practiced latte art, even challenging others to latte art competitions. This interest has also led Butler to travel to coffee farms in Costa Rica, among other places, to further study the coffee business. Butler further plans to travel to Africa off similar motivations. In August 2021, Bigface won bids for coffee beans in the Cup of Excellence auction, where the company bid $65,000 for over 1,000 pounds of premium El Salvador coffee. In addition to El Salvador, Bigface has been noted to source coffee beans from farms from various other countries including Ethiopia, Honduras, Colombia, and Ecuador.

To further expand Bigface, Butler joined Shopify's creator program, which sees Shopify select a group of athlete entrepreneurs, not taking any fees or equity stake, but integrating them into their e-commerce platform and using their name, image, and likeness for promotional purposes. Butler officially launched Bigface Coffee as a company on October 1, 2021. The launch date was selected to coincide with International Coffee Day. Partnering with Shopify, Bigface launched a non-fungible token (NFT) online store, which sold limited-time boxes including coffee blends. In addition to selling coffee, Bigface also functions as a lifestyle brand, selling apparel produced by Lululemon and related merchandise through its online e-commerce platform. Bigface collaborated with designer Daniel Patrick to release a clothing line at the Art Basel event in Miami in 2022.

=== Pop-up shops and collaboration efforts ===
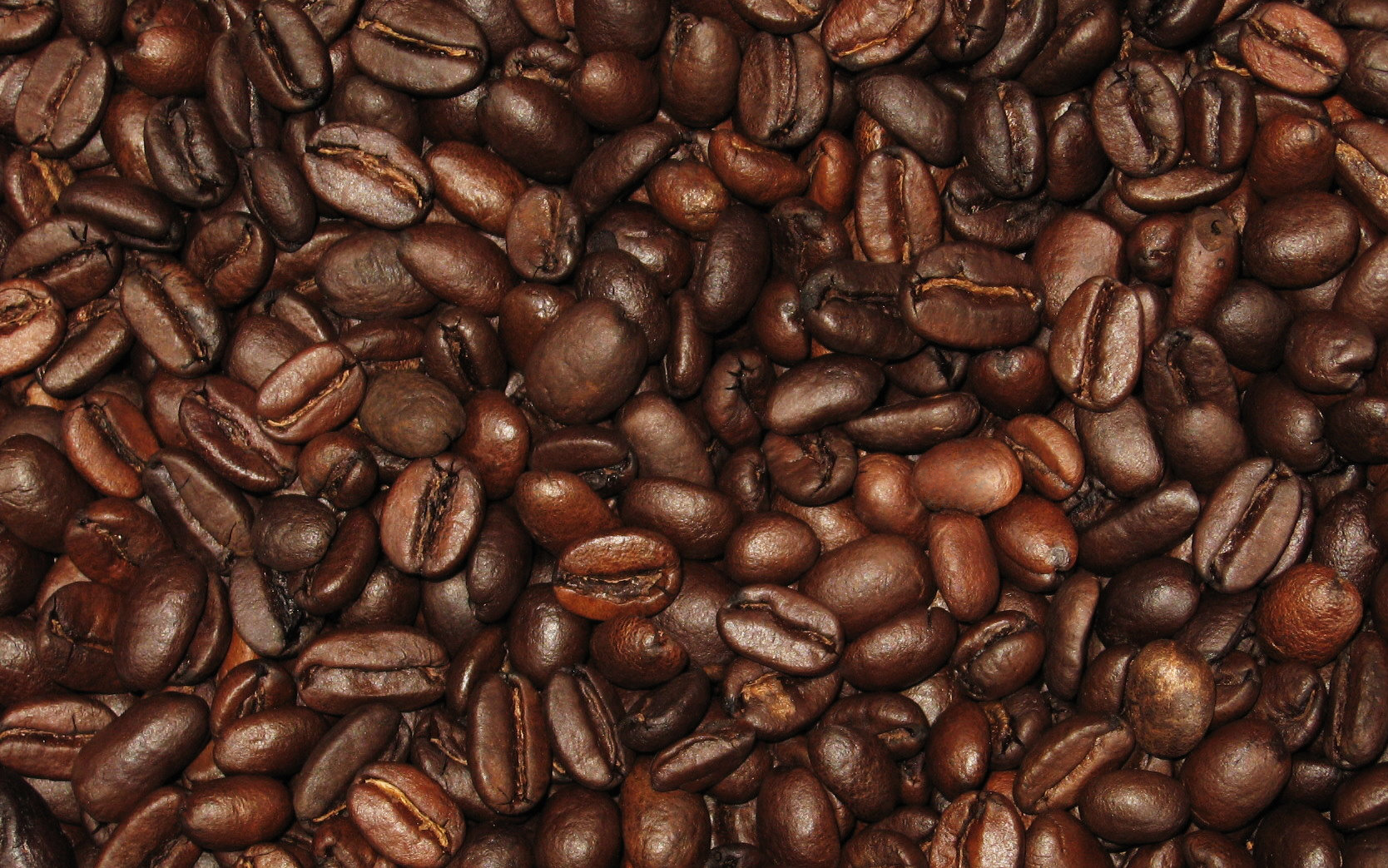
An image of Ethiopian-sourced coffee beans, which have been used in Bigface's collaboration with Van Leeuwen

In 2022, Bigface opened pop-up shops, beginning with their partnership with Van Leeuwen, which sold caffeinated ice cream in New York City on Greenwich Street in Tribeca. Using Ethiopian-sourced beans, the ice cream was affogato-flavored. The flavor was also made available at Van Leeuwen's scoop shop locations throughout the United States. The partnership followed up with pop-up shops in Miami, one at the Miami Open tennis tournament and another in the city's Design District. Bigface also served as the official coffee brand sponsor for players and VIP lounges at the Masters and WTA 1000 events in Miami.

In April, Butler filed further trademark applications to have the Bigface brand include fresh produce, beverages, and baked goods. In October, Bigface collaborated with Onyx Coffee Lab to release boxed sets including coffee blends and mugs. The partnership arose after Butler visited the Amsterdam Hummingbird cafe, which Onyx is the home roaster of.

Another Bigface pop-up arose in May 2023, offering the brand's coffee for free at the Paddock Club at the Miami Grand Prix. In the same month, Bigface collaborated with Lids. Another Bigface pop-up would be set up at the Kaseya Center ahead of Game 3 of the 2023 NBA Finals, which Butler's Heat hosted.

Bigface would also collaborate with Artpresso, a design company, to release customized espresso machines and barista accessories. Previously, Artpresso helped customize a Strada espresso machine model from La Marzocco for Bigface, as well as a Linea Mini model exclusively for Butler, which he would take on road NBA games. Later in August, Bigface collaborated with the coffee brand Fellow to release coffee-related products such as grinders, scales, and pour-over kettles. In 2024, Bigface collaborated with Bacardi, as well as the Miami-based Salty Donut.

Packaging by Brandmonger and Zenpack for Bigface's coffee products earned a runner-up award at the 2023 Core77 Design Awards.

=== Future plans ===
Bigface has plans to open cafés in Miami and San Diego, where Butler lives during NBA offseasons. The former will be the location of Bigface's first brick-and-mortar location, set to open in September 2024.

Maintaining close involvement with Bigface's ventures, Butler also plans to expand the brand to have a global presence through cafés and grocery store merchandise.

== See also ==
- Coffee culture
- List of coffee companies
