= Jimmy Butler =

American basketball player (born 1989)

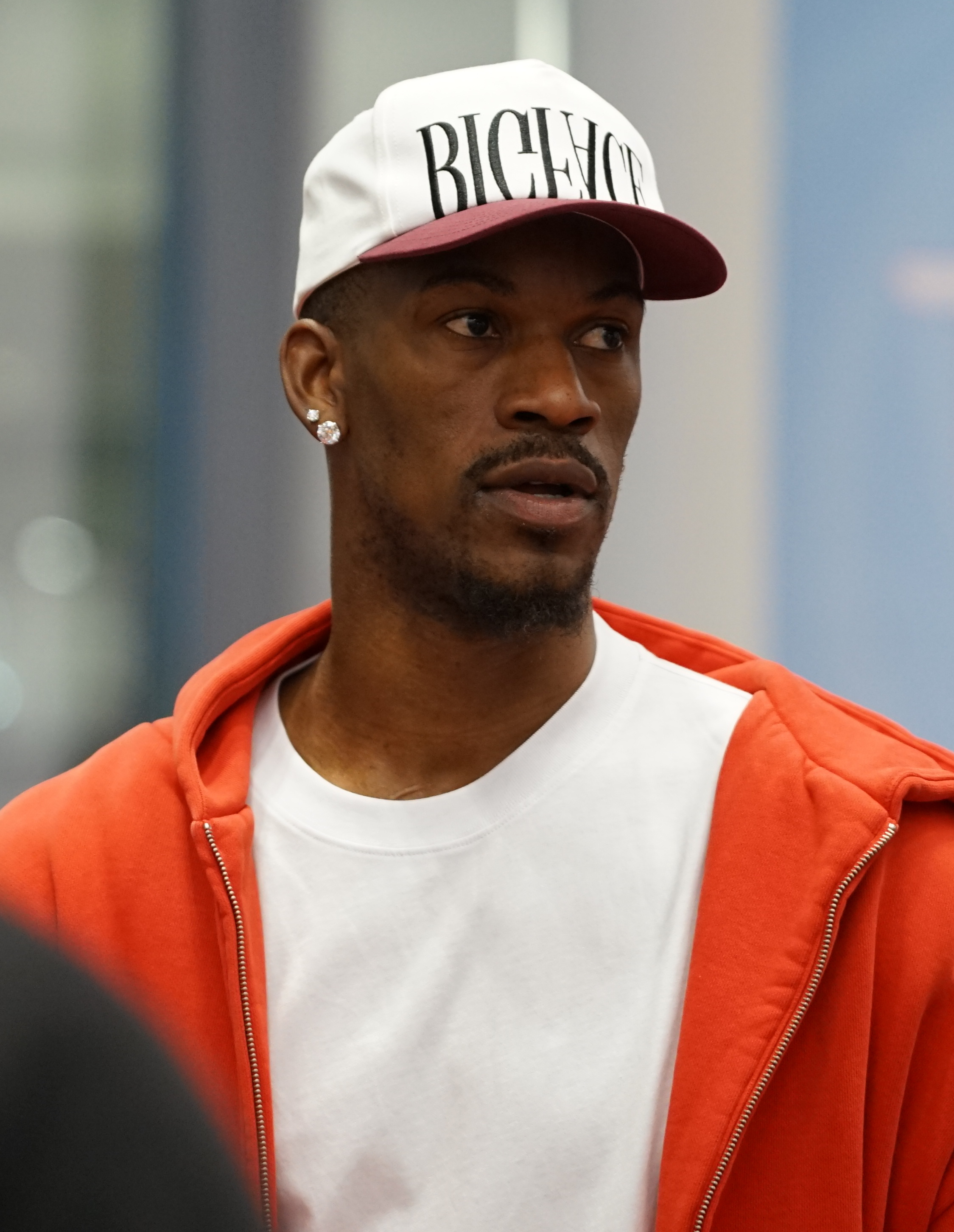
- Butler in 2026

No. 10 – Golden State Warriors
- Position: Small forward
- League: NBA

Personal information
- Born: September 14, 1989 (age 37) Houston, Texas, U.S.
- Listed height: 6 ft 6 in (1.98 m)
- Listed weight: 230 lb (104 kg)

Career information
- High school: Tomball (Tomball, Texas)
- College: Tyler JC (2007–2008); Marquette (2008–2011)
- NBA draft: 2011: 1st round, 30th overall pick
- Drafted by: Chicago Bulls
- Playing career: 2011–present

Career history
- 2011–2017: Chicago Bulls
- 2017–2018: Minnesota Timberwolves
- 2018–2019: Philadelphia 76ers
- 2019–2025: Miami Heat
- 2025–present: Golden State Warriors

Career highlights
- 6× NBA All-Star (2015–2018, 2020, 2022); All-NBA Second Team (2023); 4× All-NBA Third Team (2017, 2018, 2020, 2021); 5× NBA All-Defensive Second Team (2014–2016, 2018, 2021); NBA Eastern Conference finals MVP (2023); NBA steals leader (2021); NBA Most Improved Player (2015)
- Stats at NBA.com
- Stats at Basketball Reference
Medals
Men's basketball
Representing the United States
Olympic Games
Gold medal – first place	2016 Rio de Janeiro	Team

Jimmy Butler III (born September 14, 1989) is an American professional basketball player for the Golden State Warriors of the National Basketball Association (NBA). Nicknamed "Jimmy Buckets", he is a six-time NBA All-Star, a five-time All-NBA Team member, and a five-time NBA All-Defensive Team member. He won a gold medal as a member of the 2016 U.S. Olympic team.

Butler played college basketball for the Marquette Golden Eagles before being selected by the Chicago Bulls in the first round of the 2011 NBA draft with the 30th overall pick. In 2015, he was named the NBA Most Improved Player. After six seasons in Chicago, he was traded to the Minnesota Timberwolves in June 2017, and was then again traded in November 2018, this time to the Philadelphia 76ers. In July 2019, he signed with the Miami Heat. During his first season with the team, Butler reached the NBA Finals. In 2021, he led the league in steals. In 2023, Butler and the eighth-seeded Heat played in the 2023 NBA Finals, their second appearance in four years. Amidst conflicts with the Heat's front office, Butler was traded to the Warriors in 2025.

== Early life ==
Butler was born in Houston on September 14, 1989. His father, Jimmy Butler Jr., left the family when Butler was an infant. Butler lived with his mother in the Houston suburb of Tomball, until she kicked him out of the house when he was 13 years old. As Butler remembered it in a 2011 interview, she told him, "I don't like the look of you. You gotta go." He moved between the homes of various friends, staying for a few weeks at a time before moving to another house. Butler maintains a relationship with his parents, saying, "I don't hold grudges. I still talk to my family. My mom. My father. We love each other. That's never going to change."

In a summer basketball league before his senior year at Tomball High School, he was noticed by Jordan Leslie, a freshman football and basketball player at the school, who challenged him to a three-point shooting contest. The two became friends, and Butler stayed at Leslie's house for a few months, Leslie's mother and stepfather had six other children between them. Butler would later say, "They accepted me into their family. And it wasn't because of basketball. She [Michelle Lambert, Leslie's mother] was just very loving. She just did stuff like that. I couldn't believe it."

As a junior at Tomball High, Butler averaged 10 points per game. As a senior and team captain in 2006–07, Butler averaged 19.9 points and 8.7 rebounds per game and was subsequently voted his team's most valuable player.

Butler was not recruited coming out of high school and chose to attend Tyler Junior College in Tyler, Texas.

== College career ==
After his freshman season at Tyler Junior College, where he had averaged 18.1 points, 7.7 rebounds, and 3.1 assists per game, Butler received interest from Division I programs. Considered a two-star recruit by 247Sports.com, he was listed as the no. 127 junior college prospect in 2008.

Butler accepted an athletic scholarship to attend Marquette University, where, as a sophomore in the 2008–09 season, he averaged 5.6 points and 3.9 rebounds per game and recorded a free-throw percentage of 76.8%. He moved into the Golden Eagles' starting lineup as a junior during the 2009–10 season to average 14.7 points and 6.4 rebounds per game and received All-Big East Honorable Mention honors. Butler had two game-winning shots versus UConn and St. John's, to help Marquette finish 11–7 in the Big East and earn its fifth consecutive NCAA tournament appearance. As a senior in 2010–11, he averaged 15.7 points per game and received All-Big East Honorable Mention for the second straight year.

== Professional career ==
=== Chicago Bulls (2011–2017) ===
==== 2011–2014: early years and first All-Defensive selection ====
Butler was selected with the 30th overall pick in the 2011 NBA draft by the Chicago Bulls. He played 42 games during the lockout-shortened 2011–12 season. The following season, he played all 82 games for the Bulls. Butler played limited minutes to begin the 2012–13 season. His minutes increased over the second half of the season and he started in all 12 playoff games. In an April 9, 2013, regular season game, Butler scored a then career-high 28 points in a 101–98 loss against the Toronto Raptors. Two days later, he recorded his first NBA double-double game with 22 points and a then career-high 14 rebounds against the New York Knicks.

Butler missed 15 games due to injury in the 2013–14 season, but averaged a career-high and season league-high 38.7 minutes per game in the 67 in which he played. He scored a season-high 26 points against the Memphis Grizzlies on December 30. He set a franchise record when he played 60:20 in a triple-overtime game against the Orlando Magic on January 15, finishing with 21 points, seven rebounds and six assists. At the season's end, he was named to the NBA All-Defensive Second Team.

==== 2014–2016: Most Improved Player and first All-Star selections ====
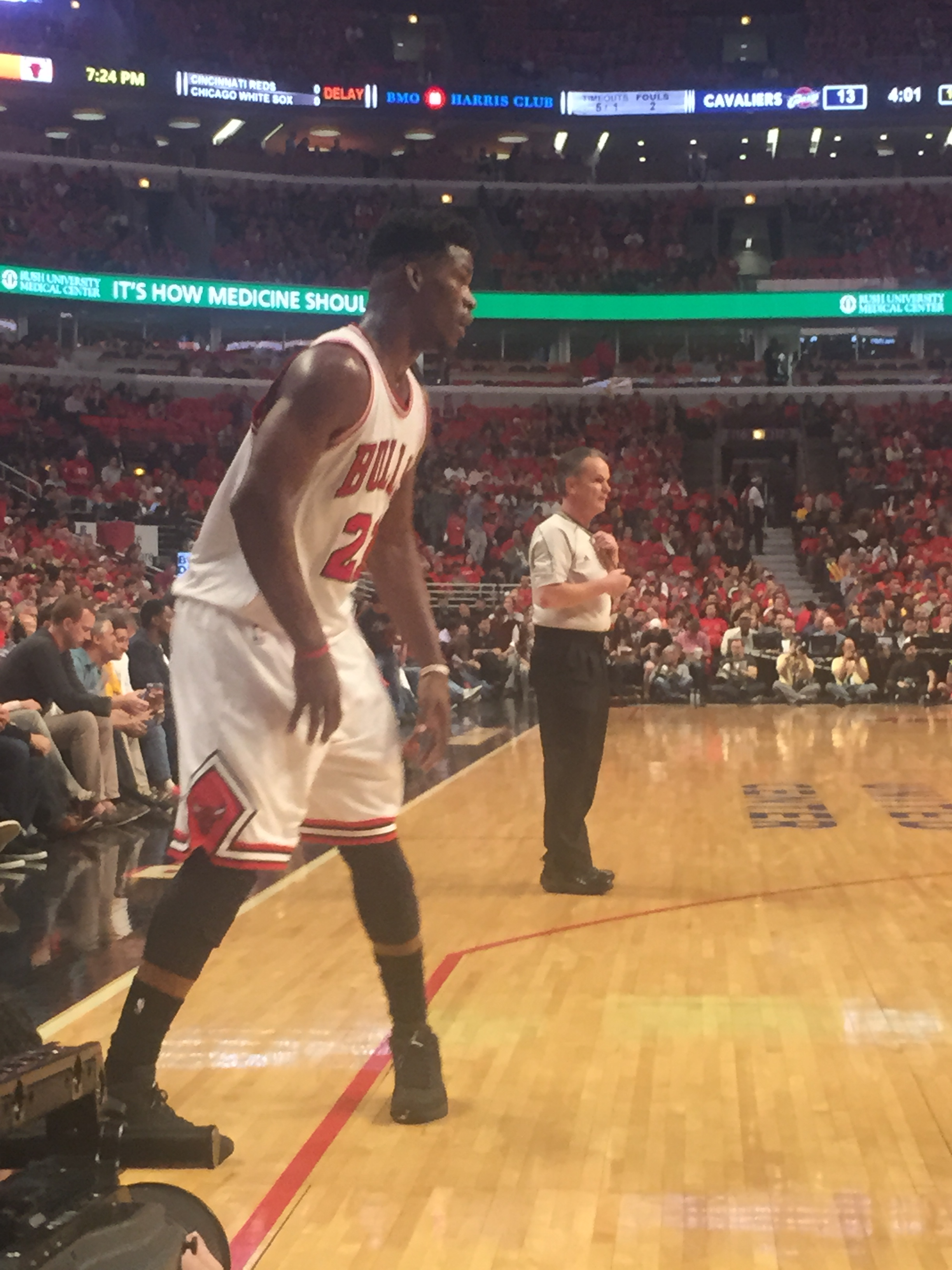
Butler in a 2015 playoff game against the Cleveland Cavaliers

On November 25, 2014, Butler tied a career high with 32 points in a loss to the Denver Nuggets. On December 3, 2014, he was named the Eastern Conference Player of the Month for games played in October/November. He set a new career high of 35 points in a 103–97 win over the New York Knicks on December 18. On January 29, 2015, Butler was named a reserve for the Eastern Conference in the 2015 NBA All-Star Game. On March 2, 2015, he was ruled out for three to six weeks with a left elbow injury. He returned to play on March 23 against the Charlotte Hornets, recording 19 points and 9 rebounds in a 98–86 win.

On April 20, Butler set a playoff career high for the second straight game, scoring 31 points in the Bulls' 91–82 win over the Milwaukee Bucks to take a 2–0 lead in their first-round series. On April 25, Butler again set a playoff career high with 33 points, in a Bulls' 92–90 loss to the Bucks, holding their series lead to 3–2. They went on to win game 6 of the series, moving them onto the conference semifinals where they lost 4–2 to the Cleveland Cavaliers. On May 7, he was named the 2014–15 NBA Most Improved Player and became the first player in franchise history to win the award.

On July 9, 2015, Butler re-signed with the Bulls to a five-year, $95 million contract. The deal included a player option for the fifth year. On December 9, he scored a then career-high 36 points in a loss to the Boston Celtics. He topped that mark with 43 points on December 18 in a 147–144 quadruple overtime loss to the Detroit Pistons. On January 3, Butler broke Michael Jordan's team record for points in a half, scoring 40 of his 42 after the break to lead the Bulls to a 115–113 win over the Toronto Raptors. Two days later, he recorded 32 points and a then season-high 10 assists in a 117–106 win over the Milwaukee Bucks. On January 14, he scored a career-high 53 points in a 115–111 overtime win over the Philadelphia 76ers. Butler had 10 rebounds and six assists while making 15-of-30 field goals and 21-of-25 free throws to help the Bulls end a three-game losing streak. He became the first Bulls player to score 50 points in a game since Jamal Crawford in 2004.

On February 5, Butler suffered a left knee strain in a game against the Denver Nuggets, and missed the next month. That included the 2016 NBA All-Star Game, to which he had been voted in; he was replaced by teammate Pau Gasol. Butler missed 11 games with the knee injury, returning to action for the Bulls on March 5, against the Houston Rockets. In 34 minutes of playing, he recorded 24 points, 11 rebounds, six assists and one steal in a 108–100 win, helping the Bulls break a four-game losing streak. He returned to the sidelines on March 7, for the team's game against the Milwaukee Bucks due to back soreness and swelling in his left knee. After a three-game absence, he returned to play on March 14 against the Toronto Raptors. On April 2, he recorded his first career triple-double with 28 points and career highs of 17 rebounds and 12 assists in a 94–90 loss to the Detroit Pistons. In the Bulls' season finale on April 13, Butler recorded his second career triple-double with 10 points, 12 rebounds and 10 assists in a 115–105 win over the Philadelphia 76ers.

==== 2016–2017: first All-NBA selection ====
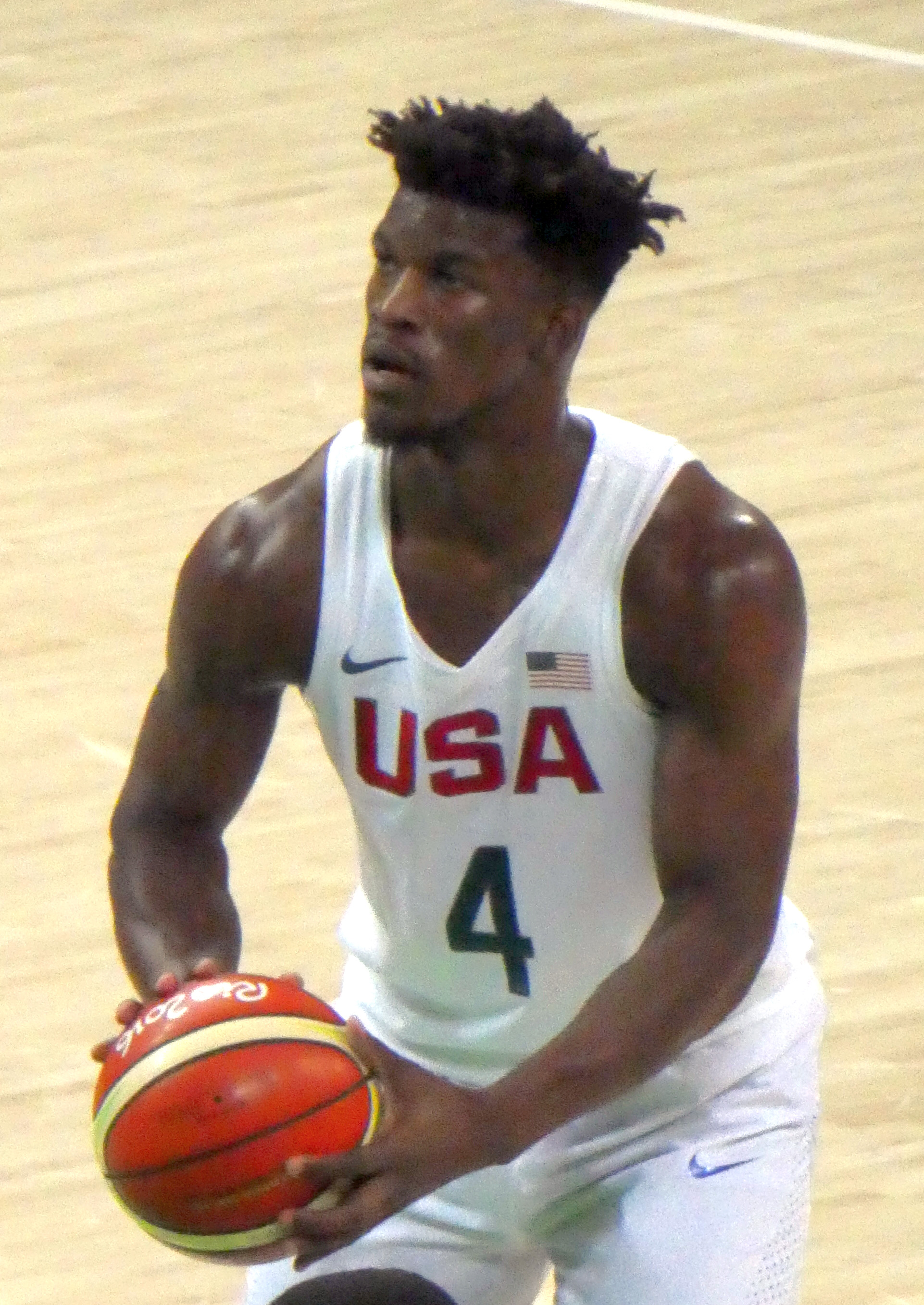
Butler with the 2016 U.S. Olympic team

In the Bulls' season opener on October 27, Butler scored a team-high 24 points in a 105–99 win over the Boston Celtics. On November 9, he scored 39-points in a 115–107 loss to the Atlanta Hawks. Three days later, he scored 37 points, made all 14 of his free throws, had eight rebounds and a season-high nine assists in a 106–95 win over the Washington Wizards. On November 20, he scored a season-high 40 points in a 118–110 win over the Los Angeles Lakers. The following day, he was named Eastern Conference Player of the Week for games played Monday, November 14 through Sunday, November 20. On December 28, he matched his season-high with 40 points, he hit a 20-footer at the buzzer, scored nine points in the final 2 1/2 minutes, and made all 11 of his free throws, to give the Bulls a 101–99 win over the Brooklyn Nets. Butler ended with 11 rebounds as the Bulls overcame a seven-point deficit in the final three minutes.

On January 2, 2017, Butler scored 52 points in a 118–111 win over the Charlotte Hornets, scoring 20 points in the first half and 17 in the game's final four minutes. He also had 12 rebounds and six assists, while shooting 21-of-22 from the free-throw line. On January 7, he hit the 40-point mark for the third time in six games, finishing with 42 points in a 123–118 overtime win over the Toronto Raptors. Two days later, he was named Eastern Conference Player of the Week for games played Monday, January 2 through Sunday, January 8. On January 19, Butler was named a starter on the Eastern Conference All-Star team for the 2017 NBA All-Star Game. After questioning the desire of the team's younger players following a loss to the Atlanta Hawks on January 25, Butler was fined and held out of the starting lineup against the Miami Heat on January 27. He finished with three points on 1-for-13 shooting. On February 25, 2017, he recorded his third career triple-double with 18 points, 10 rebounds and 10 assists in a 117–99 win over the Cleveland Cavaliers. On March 26, 2017, he had 20 points and a then career-high 14 assists in a 109–94 win over the Milwaukee Bucks. On April 6, 2017, he recorded his fourth career triple-double with 19 points, 10 rebounds and 10 assists in a 102–90 win over the Philadelphia 76ers.

=== Minnesota Timberwolves (2017–2018) ===
On June 22, 2017, Butler was traded, along with the rights to Justin Patton (the 16th pick in the 2017 NBA draft), to the Minnesota Timberwolves in exchange for Zach LaVine, Kris Dunn and the rights to Lauri Markkanen (the seventh pick in the 2017 NBA draft). In his debut for the Timberwolves in their season opener on October 18, Butler scored 12 points in a 107–99 loss to the San Antonio Spurs. On December 3, he scored 20 of his 33 points in the fourth quarter of the Timberwolves' 112–106 win over Los Angeles Clippers. On December 12, he scored 38 points in a 118–112 overtime loss to the Philadelphia 76ers. On December 18, he scored 37 points in a 108–107 win over the Portland Trail Blazers. On December 27, Butler scored 12 of Minnesota's 14 points in overtime and finished with a season-high 39 points in a 128–125 win over the Denver Nuggets.

On January 23, he was named a Western Conference All-Star reserve. On February 9, in his return to Chicago, Butler scored 38 points in a 114–113 loss to the Bulls. Butler chose to not play in the All-Star Game, saying that the rest would benefit him for the stretch run of the season. In the Timberwolves' first game after the All-Star break, on February 23 against the Houston Rockets, Butler left the game late in the third quarter with a right knee injury. Two days later, he underwent meniscus surgery and was ruled out indefinitely. He returned just shy of six weeks later, on April 6, and scored 18 points in a 113–96 win over the Los Angeles Lakers. In game 3 of the Timberwolves' first-round playoff series against the Rockets, Butler made four 3-pointers among his 28 points in a 121–105 win. The Timberwolves went on to lose the series in five games.

Shortly before training camp in 2018, Butler requested a trade from the Timberwolves, accusing younger players of being insufficiently motivated, while indicating he would not re-sign with the team in the 2019 off-season. A month later Butler joined practice for the first time since the trade request, and teamed up with third-string players to scrimmage and win against the team's usual starters. Much of the time he spent shouting at and taunting general manager Scott Layden, head coach Tom Thibodeau, as well as various teammates. When a trade was not achieved prior to the start of the regular season, Butler opted to play for Minnesota in 2018–19. He appeared in 10 of the Timberwolves' first 13 games before being traded in early November.

=== Philadelphia 76ers (2018–2019) ===
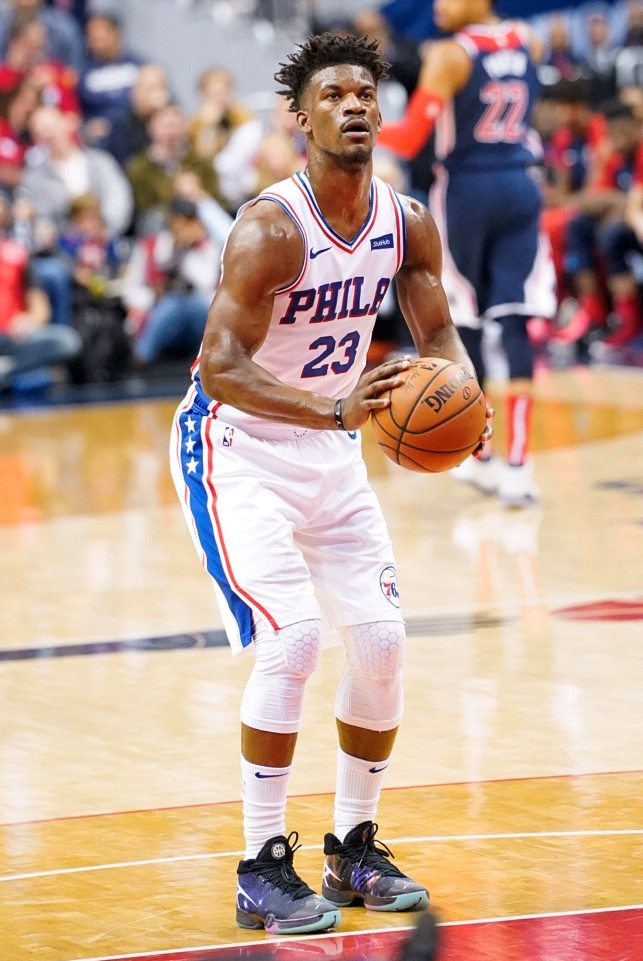
Butler prepares to shoot a free throw in 2019

On November 12, 2018, Butler was traded, along with Justin Patton, to the Philadelphia 76ers in exchange for Jerryd Bayless, Robert Covington, Dario Šarić and a 2022 second-round draft pick. He made his debut for the 76ers two days later, scoring 14 points in a 111–106 loss to the Orlando Magic. On November 25, he recorded 34 points and 12 rebounds and made a 3-pointer with 2.3 seconds remaining to give the 76ers a 127–125 victory over the Brooklyn Nets. On December 5, he scored a season-high 38 points in a 113–102 loss to the Toronto Raptors. Two days later, he had a second straight 38-point game in a 117–111 win over the Detroit Pistons. On January 29, Butler was shifted to point guard and had 20 points and six assists in a 121–105 win over the Los Angeles Lakers. In game 1 of the 76ers' first-round playoff series against the Nets, Butler scored a game-high 36 points in a 111–102 loss. In game 2 of the second round, Butler had 30 points and 11 rebounds to help the 76ers tie the series against the Raptors at 1–1 with a 94–89 win. In game 6, he scored 25 points in a 112–101 win, helping the 76ers force a game 7. In game 7, he made a layup with 4.2 seconds in the fourth quarter to tie the score at 90–all, but the 76ers eventually lost the game 92–90 following Kawhi Leonard's game-winning buzzer beater.

=== Miami Heat (2019–2025) ===
==== 2019–2021: first finals appearance and steals leader ====
On July 6, 2019, Butler signed with the Miami Heat via a sign and trade with the 76ers in a four-team trade. On December 9, Butler was named Eastern Conference Player of the Week after he averaged 27.5 points, 9.0 rebounds and 8.5 assists per game. On December 10, Butler recorded a then career-high 18 rebounds, along with 20 points and 11 assists in a 135–121 overtime win against the Atlanta Hawks. On January 30, 2020, Butler was named to his fifth NBA All-Star Game. On February 3, Butler scored a season-high 38 points on 14-of-20 shooting from the field, as the Heat beat his former team, the Philadelphia 76ers 137–106.

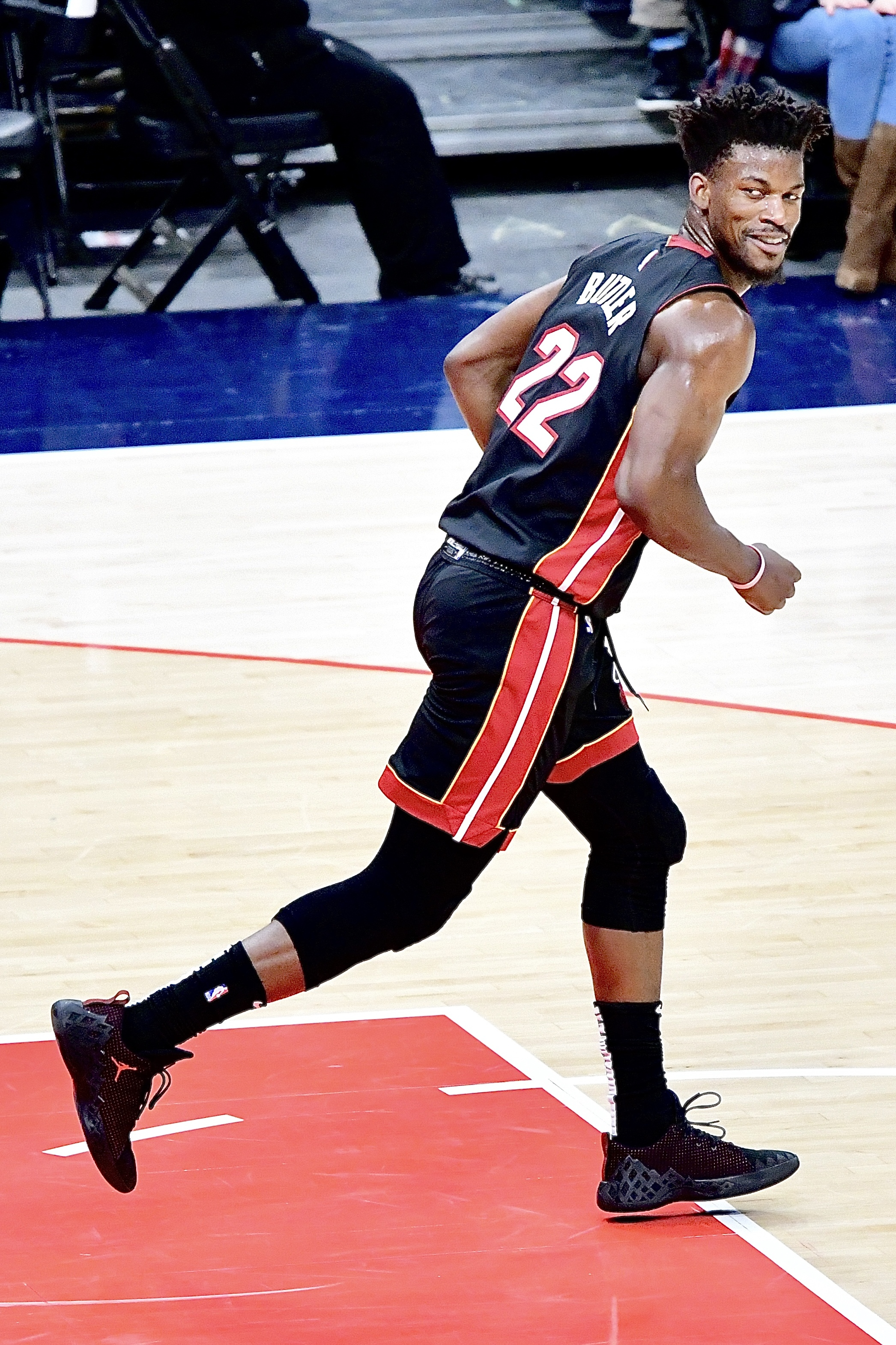
Butler in 2020 during his tenure with the Miami Heat.

On August 31, in game 1 of the Eastern Conference semifinals, Butler scored a then playoff career-high 40 points on 13-of-20 shooting from the field in a 115–104 win over the first-seeded Milwaukee Bucks. On September 8, Miami advanced to the next round after game 5 win, thus completing the upset. The Heat reached the NBA Finals after defeating the Boston Celtics in the Eastern Conference finals in six games, earning Butler his first finals appearance. In game 3 of the NBA Finals, Butler registered a triple-double of 40 points, 11 rebounds, and 13 assists in a winning effort. He became the third player in finals history to record a 40+ point triple-double, joining LeBron James (then with Cleveland) in 2015 and Jerry West with the Los Angeles Lakers in 1969. Butler also became the first player to have more points, rebounds and assists in a finals game than James, who finished with 25 points, 10 rebounds and eight assists. In game 5, Butler had 35 points, 12 rebounds, 11 assists, and five steals in a 111–108 victory. He became the first player to register 35+ points, 10+ rebounds, 10+ assists and 5+ steals in a finals game. He is also the second player to reach such stats in NBA playoff history after Gary Payton in 2000. Butler became the second player with multiple 30-point triple-doubles in the same finals series, joining James in 2015. He became the sixth player with multiple triple-doubles in a finals series along with James, Magic Johnson, Larry Bird, Wilt Chamberlain and Draymond Green. The Heat would go on to lose to the Lakers in six games. Butler became only the second player in a finals series to lead his team in points, rebounds, assists, steals and blocks, joining James in 2016. He finished the finals averaging 26.2 points, 8.3 rebounds, 9.8 assists, 2.2 steals and 0.8 blocks per game.

On February 11, 2021, Butler recorded his 10th career triple-double with 27 points, 10 rebounds and 10 assists in the Heat's 101–94 win over the Houston Rockets. On February 18, Butler logged his 13th career triple-double with 13 points, 10 rebounds and 13 assists in a 118–110 win over the Sacramento Kings, becoming the first player in franchise history with three consecutive triple-doubles. Together with teammate Bam Adebayo who posted 16 points, 12 rebounds and 10 assists, they became the first pair in league history to register triple-doubles in the same game more than once. Butler finished the regular season leading the league in steals with 2.1 steals per game. In the playoffs, the Heat were eliminated in a four-game sweep by the Milwaukee Bucks, who would go on to win the NBA Finals. In game 4, Butler recorded his third career playoff triple-double.

==== 2021–2022: top seed in Eastern Conference ====
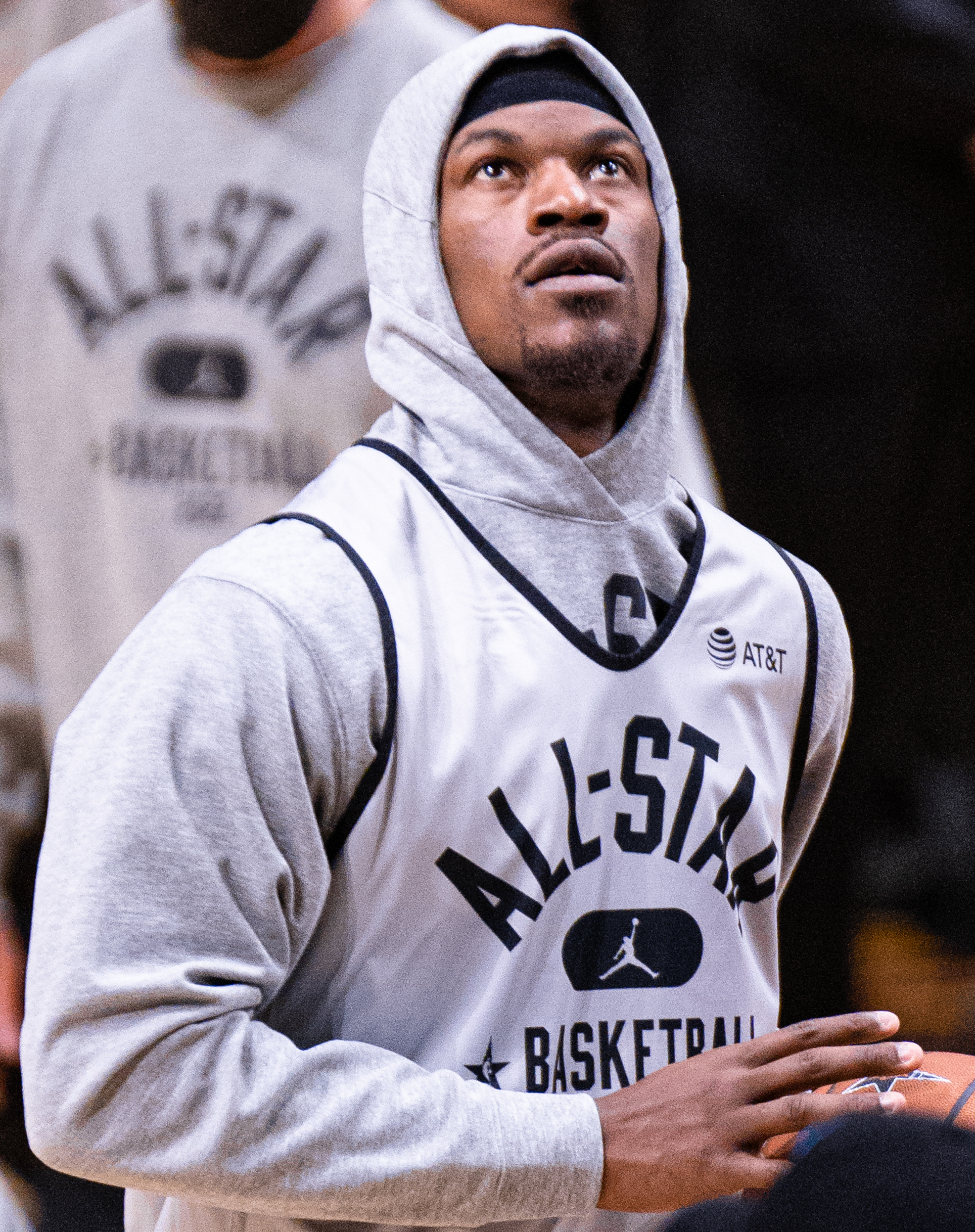
Butler at the 2022 NBA All-Star Weekend

On August 7, 2021, Butler was signed to a reported four-year, $184 million contract extension by the Heat. On December 28, he recorded 25 points, eight rebounds, and a career-high 15 assists in a 119–112 loss to the Washington Wizards. On January 23, 2022, during a matchup against the Los Angeles Lakers and LeBron James, Butler surpassed James for first place on the Heat all-time triple-doubles list. On February 3, Butler was named a reserve for the 2022 NBA All-Star Game, making it his sixth career All-Star selection. On April 7, Butler and Miami clinched the first seed in the Eastern Conference.

On April 17, during game 1 of the first round of the playoffs, he logged 21 points, six rebounds, four assists and three steals in a 115–91 win over the Atlanta Hawks. Two days later, he posted a then playoff career-high 45 points along with five rebounds, five assists and zero turnovers in a game 2 115–105 win. Butler became only the third player in franchise history to have at least 45 points, five assists and five rebounds in a postseason game, joining James and Dwyane Wade. He also became the fifth player since 1978 to have at least 45 points and zero turnovers in an NBA playoff game. In game 4 of the series, on April 24, Butler recorded 36 points, 10 rebounds, four assists and four steals in a 110–86 win. On May 8, in game 4 of the Eastern Conference semifinals, Butler recorded 40 points on 13-of-20 shooting from the field in a 116–108 loss to the Philadelphia 76ers.

On May 17, in game 1 of the Eastern Conference finals, Butler posted 41 points (27 in the second half), nine rebounds, five assists, four steals and three blocks in a 118–107 win over the Boston Celtics. He became the first player in NBA postseason history to meet all of those benchmarks since steals and blocks were first recorded in 1974. Butler posted his fifth career playoff game with 40 points on 60 percent shooting, and tied with Charles Barkley for third-most over the last 30 playoffs. The only players that have more such games are James (12) and Shaquille O'Neal (8). Butler also achieved the most 40-point, 5-rebound and 5-assist playoff games in Heat history with three, one more than James and Wade. On May 21, Butler injured his right knee and did not play in the second half of game 3. Despite this, Miami won the game 109–103 and took a 2–1 series lead. In game 6 of the series, on May 27, Butler scored a playoff career-high 47 points along with nine rebounds, eight assists, and four steals to lead Miami to a 111–103 win and force game 7. He made 16 of 29 shots, including 4-of-8 from the three-point range and all 11 free throws. Butler's 47 points were the seventh-most in NBA history for a player facing elimination. He also became the first player since Michael Jordan in 1988 to have multiple games of at least 40 points and four steals in the same series.

The Heat lost the series in seven games, despite Butler's 35-point and nine-rebound outing in a 100–96 loss in a decisive game 7, where he missed his game-winning three-pointer with 16 seconds left in the game. Butler had his eighth 30-point game of the postseason, making it the most in a single postseason by a Heat player since James in 2013, who also had eight such games.

==== 2022–2024: second finals appearance ====
On November 10, 2022, Butler scored a season-high 35 points, along with 10 rebounds and eight assists in a 117–112 overtime win over the Charlotte Hornets. He scored eight consecutive Heat points at the end of regulation just to get them into the extra session. On December 2, Butler returned to the lineup after missing the previous seven games with a sore right knee. He had a season-high 15 rebounds and 25 points in a 120–116 overtime win over the reigning Eastern Conference champions Boston Celtics. On January 10, 2023, Butler tied his season-high with 35 points, along with seven rebounds, four assists, four steals and three blocks in a 112–111 win over the Oklahoma City Thunder. He led the way going 23-of-23 from the free throw line, tying Dominique Wilkins for the second-most made free throws without a miss in NBA history. The Heat set an NBA record by making all 40 of their free throws, the last of those coming on Butler's three-point play with 12.9 seconds left in the game. On February 10, Butler made a game-winning alley-oop dunk in a 97–95 win over the Houston Rockets. On March 11, Butler scored a season-high 38 points, including 15 in the final six minutes of the fourth quarter when Miami overcame a 15-point deficit. His three-pointer at the buzzer of regulation sent the game to overtime, which the Heat lost 126–114 in against the Orlando Magic. On April 1, Butler recorded a season-high 12 assists and 35 points on 12-of-16 shooting from the field in a 129–122 win over the Dallas Mavericks.

On April 14, Butler in his second play-in appearance scored a game-high 31 points to help the Heat take a 102–91 win over his former team, the Chicago Bulls, and secure the eighth seed for the playoffs. He and Max Strus became the third Heat duo with 30 points apiece in a playoff or play-in game.

As the Eastern Conference eighth seed, the Heat faced off in the first round of the playoffs against top-seeded Milwaukee Bucks. In game 1, Butler recorded 35 points, five rebounds, 11 assists and three steals as Miami won 130–117. This performance moved Butler to second place in 35+ point playoff games in Heat franchise history (10), surpassing LeBron James (9) and trailing only Dwyane Wade (14). In game 4 of the series, Butler scored a career-high 56 points on 19-for-28 shooting from the field and 15-of-18 shooting from the free throw line, including a franchise-record 22 points in the first quarter, in a 119–114 win. His 56 points also set a Miami Heat franchise record for the most points scored in a playoff game, surpassing LeBron James's previous record of 49. In game 5, Butler recorded 42 points, eight rebounds, four assists and two steals in a 128–126 overtime win, sealing a shocking upset over the Bucks, and leading the Heat to the second round of the playoffs. Butler also became the first player in Heat history to put up back-to-back 40-point playoff games. He also put up his eighth 40-point playoff game as a member of the Heat, surpassing Dwyane Wade's previous Heat franchise record of seven 40-point playoff games. In Games 4 and 5, Butler amassed a total of 98 points, becoming one of five players in NBA playoff history to produce that many points in a two-game span. He joined Michael Jordan (who accomplished the feat on three occasions), Jerry West, Elgin Baylor and Rick Barry. Butler finished the series averaging 37.6 points, 6 rebounds, 4.8 assists and 1.8 steals per game.

In game 1 of the Eastern Conference finals, Butler recorded 35 points, five rebounds, seven assists and a playoff career-high six steals in a 123–116 win over the Boston Celtics. In game 7, Butler posted 28 points, seven rebounds, six assists and three steals in a 103–84 win, defeating the Celtics and advancing to the NBA Finals. Butler was named Eastern Conference Finals MVP, averaging 24.7 points, 7.6 rebounds, 6.1 assists and 2.6 steals per game, narrowly edging out Caleb Martin.

In game 2 of the NBA Finals against the Denver Nuggets, Butler put up 21 points and nine assists in a 111–108 win to tie the series at one each. He joined LeBron James and Dwyane Wade as the only players in Heat history to put up at least 500 points, 100 rebounds, and 100 assists in a single postseason run. However, the Heat went on to lose the next three games of the series, dropping the finals in five games.

On November 16, 2023, Butler scored 36 points in a 122–115 win over the Brooklyn Nets, to lead the Heat to their first seven-game win streak since January 14, 2018. On December 16, Butler put up 28 points alongside a buzzer-beating, game-winning step back jumper in a 118–116 win over the Chicago Bulls. On February 7, 2024, Butler recorded his 16th career triple-double with 17 points, 11 rebounds, 11 assists and three steals in a 116–104 win over the San Antonio Spurs. On March 2, Butler scored a season-high 37 points on 12-of-19 shooting, 3-of-3 from three and 10-of-11 from the free throw line in a 126–120 win over the Utah Jazz. Butler missed the 2024 NBA playoffs following a medial collateral ligament (MCL) sprain he sustained during a play-in game against the Philadelphia 76ers.

==== 2024–2025: requesting a trade and suspension ====
On November 24, 2024, Butler scored 33 points along with nine rebounds and six assists in a 123–118 overtime win over the Dallas Mavericks. On December 16, he had 35 points, 19 rebounds and 10 assists in a 125–124 loss to the Detroit Pistons, becoming the third player in NBA history to finish with at least 35 points, 19 rebounds, 10 assists and four steals in a game, joining DeMarcus Cousins in 2018 and George McGinnis in 1976.

On January 3, 2025, the Heat suspended Butler for seven games, citing multiple instances of conduct detrimental to the team throughout the season. The suspension followed reports of Butler's growing discontent and his statement the previous day that he no longer believed he could be happy playing in Miami. In an official statement, the Heat confirmed that Butler and his representative had requested a trade and announced their intention to consider offers. Butler returned to the Heat on January 17 in a game against the Denver Nuggets, scoring 18 points in a 133–113 loss. On January 22, he was again suspended by the Heat for two games due to a pattern of detrimental conduct. Butler had missed the team flight to Milwaukee earlier in the day to play against the Bucks. On January 27, the Heat suspended Butler for an indefinite period of time without pay after he walked out of practice before a game against the Magic. He left after learning that Haywood Highsmith would be replacing him in the starting lineup. The Heat said in their official statement that the suspension was to last at least five games, which would take it through the NBA's trade deadline on February 6.

=== Golden State Warriors (2025–present) ===
On February 6, 2025, Butler was traded to the Golden State Warriors in a five-team deal that sent a package headed by Andrew Wiggins to the Heat. In addition, Butler declined his player option for the 2025–26 season, which was replaced by a two-year, $121 million contract extension with the Warriors, which runs through the 2026–27 season. He chose to wear "Butler III" on his jersey during his Warriors' tenure, honoring his late father. On February 8, he made his Warriors' debut, putting up 25 points in a 132–111 win over the Chicago Bulls. On March 10, Butler recorded his first triple-double with the Warriors, scoring 15 points to go with 10 rebounds and 10 assists, the first triple-double of the season for Golden State and the 18th of Butler's career.

On April 15, Butler made his play-in debut with the Warriors, recording a game-high 38 points along with seven rebounds and six assists in a 121–116 win over the Memphis Grizzlies to secure the seventh seed for the playoffs. On April 20, Butler, in his playoff debut with the Warriors, recorded 25 points, seven rebounds, six assists and five steals in a 95–85 victory against the Houston Rockets. In game 7 of the first round, Butler contributed 20 points, eight rebounds, and seven assists as the Warriors eliminated the Rockets with a 103–89 road win to advance to the Western Conference semifinals. However, Butler and the Warriors would go on to be eliminated in five games by Butler's former team, the Minnesota Timberwolves.

On January 19, 2026, Butler suffered a season-ending injury in a game against his former team, the Heat, after tearing his right anterior cruciate ligament (ACL), which required surgery. Through 38 games, Butler averaged 20.0 points, 5.6 rebounds, and 4.9 assists per game, marking his ninth season averaging at least 20 points, and helped the Warriors to a 25–19 record at the time of his injury. With Butler sidelined and teammate Stephen Curry also missing time due to a knee injury, the Warriors finished with a 37–45 record and were eliminated in the NBA play-in tournament, missing the playoffs.

== Awards and honors ==
NBA

- 6× NBA All-Star: 2015–2018, 2020, 2022
- 5× All-NBA Team selections:
  - All-NBA Second Team: 2023
  - 4× All-NBA Third Team: 2017, 2018, 2020, 2021
- 5× NBA All-Defensive Second Team: 2014–2016, 2018, 2021
- NBA Most Improved Player: 2015
- NBA minutes played leader: 2015
- NBA steals leader: 2021
- NBA Eastern Conference Finals MVP: 2023

USA Basketball

- Summer Olympics gold medalist: 2016

== Career statistics ==
Legend
GP	Games played	GS	Games started	MPG	Minutes per game
FG%	Field goal percentage	3P%	3-point field goal percentage	FT%	Free throw percentage
RPG	Rebounds per game	APG	Assists per game	SPG	Steals per game
BPG	Blocks per game	PPG	Points per game	**Bold**	Career high
*	Led the league

=== NBA ===
==== Regular season ====
Year	Team	GP	GS	MPG	FG%	3P%	FT%	RPG	APG	SPG	BPG	PPG
2011–12	Chicago	42	0	8.5	.405	.182	.768	1.3	.3	.3	.1	2.6
2012–13	Chicago	**82***	20	26.0	.467	.381	.803	4.0	1.4	1.0	.4	8.6
2013–14	Chicago	67	67	**38.7**	.397	.283	.769	4.9	2.6	1.9	.5	13.1
2014–15	Chicago	65	65	**38.7***	.462	.378	.834	5.8	3.3	1.8	.6	20.0
2015–16	Chicago	67	67	36.9	.454	.312	.832	5.3	4.8	1.6	.6	20.9
2016–17	Chicago	76	**75**	37.0	.455	.367	.865	6.2	5.5	1.9	.4	**23.9**
2017–18	Minnesota	59	59	36.7	.474	.350	.854	5.3	4.9	2.0	.4	22.2
2018–19	Minnesota	10	10	36.1	.471	.378	.787	5.2	4.3	**2.4**	**1.0**	21.3
2018–19	Philadelphia	55	55	33.2	.461	.338	.868	5.3	4.0	1.8	.5	18.2
2019–20	Miami	58	58	33.8	.455	.244	.834	6.7	6.0	1.8	.6	19.9
2020–21	Miami	52	52	33.6	.497	.245	.863	**6.9**	**7.1**	2.1*	.3	21.5
2021–22	Miami	57	57	33.9	.480	.233	**.870**	5.9	5.5	1.6	.5	21.4
2022–23	Miami	64	64	33.4	.539	.350	.850	5.9	5.3	1.8	.3	22.9
2023–24	Miami	60	60	34.0	.499	**.414**	.858	5.3	5.0	1.3	.3	20.8
2024–25	Miami	25	25	30.6	**.540**	.361	.801	5.2	4.8	1.1	.4	17.0
2024–25	Golden State	30	30	32.7	.476	.279	**.870**	5.5	5.9	1.7	.3	17.9
2025–26	Golden State	38	38	31.1	.519	.376	.864	5.6	4.9	1.4	.2	20.0
Career		907	802	33.0	.474	.330	.844	5.4	4.4	1.6	.4	18.4
All-Star		4	1	12.7	.750	.000	—	1.8	1.5	1.8	.0	4.5

==== Playoffs ====
Year	Team	GP	GS	MPG	FG%	3P%	FT%	RPG	APG	SPG	BPG	PPG
2012	Chicago	3	0	1.3	—	—	—	.0	.0	.0	.0	.0
2013	Chicago	12	12	40.8	.435	.405	.818	5.2	2.7	1.3	.5	13.3
2014	Chicago	5	5	**43.6**	.386	.300	.783	5.2	2.2	1.4	.0	13.6
2015	Chicago	12	12	42.2	.441	.389	.819	5.6	3.2	**2.4**	**.8**	22.9
2017	Chicago	6	6	39.8	.426	.261	.809	7.3	4.3	1.7	**.8**	22.7
2018	Minnesota	5	5	34.0	.444	**.471**	.833	6.0	4.0	.8	.2	15.8
2019	Philadelphia	12	12	35.1	.451	.267	**.875**	6.1	5.2	1.4	.6	19.4
2020	Miami	21	21	38.4	.488	.349	.859	6.5	6.0	2.0	.7	22.2
2021	Miami	4	4	38.5	.297	.267	.727	**7.5**	**7.0**	1.3	.3	14.5
2022	Miami	17	17	37.0	**.506**	.338	.841	7.4	4.6	2.1	.6	**27.4**
2023	Miami	**22**	**22**	39.7	.468	.359	.806	6.5	5.9	1.8	.6	26.9
2025	Golden State	11	11	36.1	.447	.306	.800	6.6	5.2	1.3	.3	19.2
Career		130	127	37.8	.459	.344	.827	6.2	4.7	1.7	.5	21.1

=== College ===
Year	Team	GP	GS	MPG	FG%	3P%	FT%	RPG	APG	SPG	BPG	PPG
2008–09	Marquette	35	0	19.6	.514	.000	.768	3.9	.7	.5	.5	5.6
2009–10	Marquette	34	34	34.3	**.530**	**.500**	.766	**6.4**	2.0	1.3	**.6**	14.7
2010–11	Marquette	**37**	**35**	**34.6**	.490	.345	**.783**	6.1	**2.3**	**1.4**	.4	**15.7**
Career		106	69	29.6	.508	.383	.773	5.5	1.7	1.1	.5	12.0

== Off the court ==
Butler is a fan of country and emo music. He starred in the music video for the country song "Light It Up" by Luke Bryan and the emo song "So Much (for) Stardust" by Fall Out Boy.

In the NBA Bubble, Butler opened Big Face Coffee, a side business which he operated out of his hotel room using his French press coffee brewer, charging $20 per cup. A year later, he officially launched his coffee brand, and planned to dedicate his time into the coffee roastery business post-retirement.

During the 2023 NBA playoffs, Butler filed a trademark on the name "Himmy Butler" for the purpose of launching his own clothing and beverage brand. The nickname "Himmy" came from the meme phrase "he's him", which rose in popularity during the Heat's Butler-led run during that postseason.

Butler is featured in the Netflix documentary series, Starting 5, which followed Butler, Anthony Edwards, LeBron James, Domantas Sabonis, and Jayson Tatum through the 2023–24 NBA season and playoffs.

== Personal life ==
While attending Marquette, Butler earned a Bachelor of Arts degree in communications.

Butler and his former girlfriend have three children. He did not make his Heat debut until the fourth game of the 2019–20 NBA season, as he was on paternity leave after the birth of his first child. Butler's father died on February 8, 2024. Butler is a Christian.

He is good friends with Mark Wahlberg, whom he met while Wahlberg was filming Transformers: Age of Extinction in Chicago. The two have vacationed in Paris together.

Butler became a fan of soccer during the 2016 Summer Olympics, after watching Neymar Jr. play for Brazil. He has rooted for Paris Saint Germain and said his favorite player is Neymar. In October 2025, he joined San Diego Wave FC's investor group.

== See also ==
- List of NBA career free throw scoring leaders
- List of NBA career playoff triple-double leaders
- List of NBA single-game playoff scoring leaders
- List of people banned or suspended by the NBA
