= Disney's Coronado Springs Resort =

Resort Hotel at Walt Disney World

Coordinates: 28.363860°N 81.573650°W

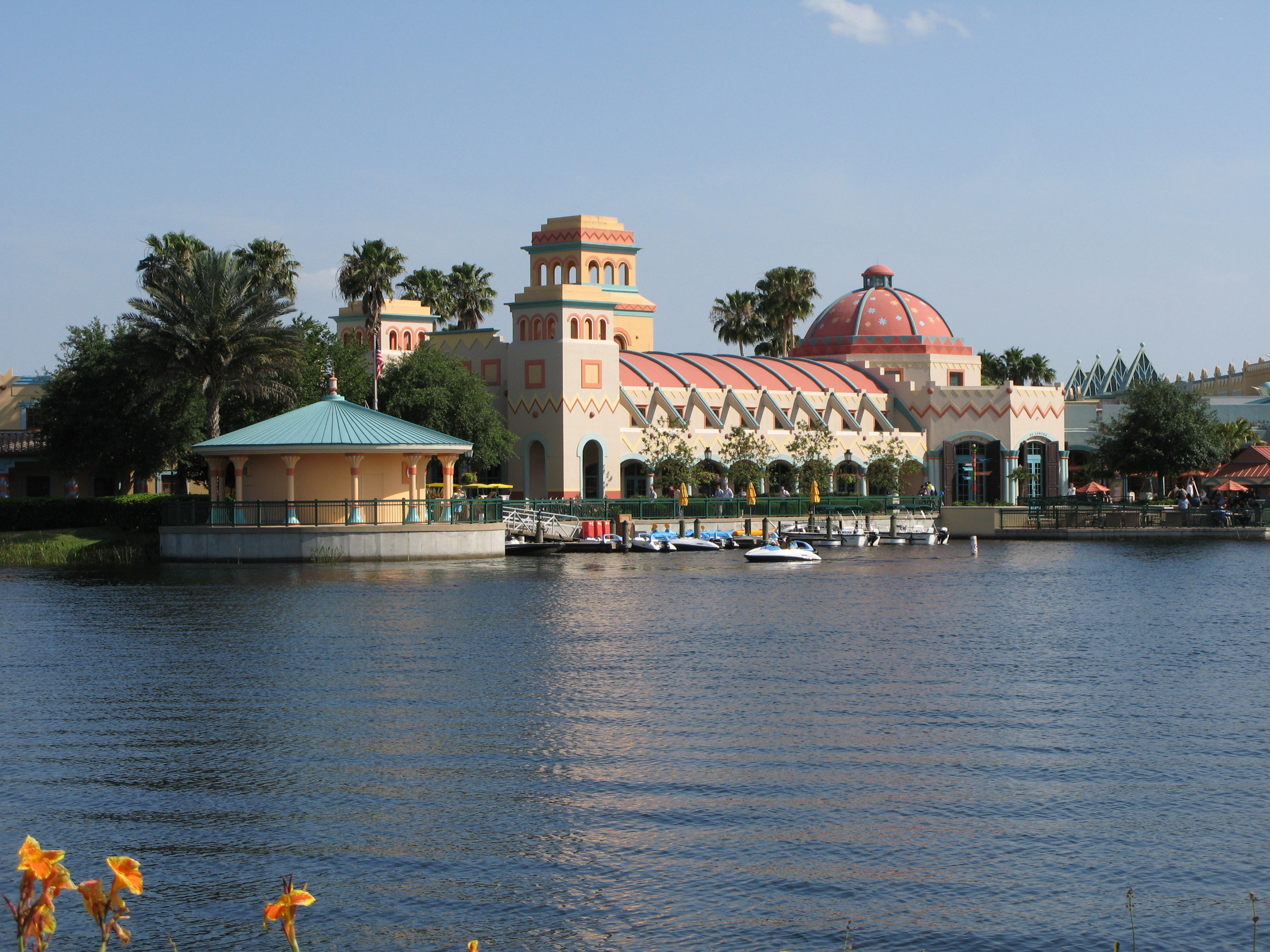

General information
- Type: Resort
- Location: Animal Kingdom Resort Area
- Opened: August 1, 1997

Other information
- Seating capacity: Detailed venue capacity: Fiesta Ballroom: 2,650; Veracruz Hall: 5,280; Coronado Ballroom: 6,684
- Number of rooms: 1,951

Website
- Official website

Disney's Coronado Springs Resort is a resort hotel at the Walt Disney World Resort in Bay Lake, Florida that opened on August 1, 1997. The resort is located in the Animal Kingdom Resort Area. Its theme is American colonial Spanish and southwestern American. This hotel is categorized as a 'moderate' resort. This was Walt Disney World's first attempt at a 'moderate' resort with a convention center. It is the only moderate level Disney resort with suites, a cafeteria-style restaurant, a formal dinner restaurant (Maya Grill), a gift shop, an arcade, one large pool, three quiet pools, a salon, fitness center, and a dance club. The resort is owned and operated by Disney Experiences.

In February 2017, a large expansion was announced, with the centerpiece being a 15-story tower located near the entrance and convention center. Other things added are "floating gardens and an oasis which connects to the rest of the resort via a series of bridges". In July 2026, Walt Disney World Resort announced that the original renovations of the Convention Center are temporarily closed on August 10, 2026 and make way for a new renovations in late September 2027. In October 2026, the concept art and plans for the Convention Center and El Centro spaces are being reimagined by Walt Disney Imagineering with updated finishes and furnishing inspired by “the vibrant cultures and natural landscapes of Spain, Mexico, and the American Southwest.”

== Accommodation descriptions ==
There are 1,951 rooms at Disney's Coronado Springs Resort located in four sections across the property. Gran Destino Tower is the main building with rooms on the 3rd through 15th floors. The Casitas are made up of 5 buildings that have 4 floors and are close to the Convention Center. The Ranchos are made up of 4 pueblo-style buildings that have 3 floors. The Cabanas are made up of 3 buildings that have 2 floors. All rooms were renovated in 2018 with new beds, a new flat screen TV, and other new furnishings.

== Pools and recreation ==
- The Lost City of Cibola Feature Pool (The Dig Site) – This themed area includes a huge pool (120-by-90), a sand volleyball court, the largest outdoor hot tub on Walt Disney World property, the 20,000 square feet (1,900 m^{2}) Explorer's Playground, and the Iguana Arcade. The focal point of the resort, the Dig Site's 46-foot (14 m), 5 story tall Mayan pyramid themed, with water slide, as a modern archaeological dig of an ancient lost kingdom. At the beginning of the day the Mayan pyramid is turned on and a huge stream of water flows down the giant steps. (Kids are allowed to participate in the opening.) The Dig Site underwent a massive renovation ending in December 2018.
- Poolside Activities – Family-friendly activities each day at the Lost City of Cibola Feature Pool include Disney trivia, an afternoon pool party and an evening campfire.
- Explorer's Playground – A themed, outdoor playground located at The Dig Site main pool complex includes swings, a water-slide, slides, and an "archeological dig sand box".
- Iguana Arcade – Adjacent to The Dig Site, an indoor arcade which offers a variety of electronic games.
- Movies Under the Stars – Adjacent to the main pool, nightly offering of a Disney movie, weather permitting.
- Pools – Three additional courtyard quiet pools are located throughout the resort.
- La Vida Health Club – A 3,000-square-foot (280 m^{2}) health club and the first fitness center to be located at a Disney moderate resort.
- Casa de Belleza Beauty Salon – The salon at Coronado Springs Resort, as well as at all Disney properties, is run by Niki Bryan Salon's. It is adjacent to the La Vida Health Club.
- La Marina – Open seasonally, the marina offers watercraft rentals to guests including boats, water-cycles, kayaks, paddle-boats, and fishing excursions in addition to bike rentals. However, "La Marina" appears to be predominantly disused, and is rarely in operation.
- Additional recreation – includes a sand volleyball court, a white sand beach, a .75-mile (1.21 km) jogging trail around Lago Dorado or 1-mile (1.6 km) on a trail that extends out past the smaller Cabanas lake and a few buildings in the Ranchos and Casitas sections of the resort.

== Expansion ==
- Gran Destino Tower – A 15-story tower, taking its name and thematic cues from the Salvador Dalí collaboration short film "Destino", added 545 guest rooms including 50 suites, and features a Spanish rooftop restaurant named "Toledo" and the "Dahlia Lounge". The tower opened in July 2019. The resort's lobby and primary bus stop moved to the tower when completed. It is also the only Disney-owned building in Walt Disney World to use a destination dispatch elevator control system (specifically Otis CompassPlus).
- Restaurant – In addition to the restaurant at the top of the tower, Disney also added a restaurant in the middle of Lago Dorado called "Three Bridges Bar and Grill".
- Updated and Modernized Guest Rooms – All guest rooms have been updated with wood floors, new beds, USB ports, flat screen TVs, Keurig coffee machines, new art, new color scheme and the renovation of the bathrooms.

== Convention Center ==
The Coronado Springs Resort Convention Center is the largest convention center on Walt Disney World property featuring 220,000-square-foot (20,000 m^{2}) of meeting space.

- Coronado Ballroom with 60,214-square-foot (5,594.1 m^{2}) and a theater-styled capacity of 6,684; this is the largest ballroom in the southeastern United States.
- Fiesta Ballroom with 21,160-square-foot (1,966 m^{2}) and a theater-styled capacity of 2,650.
- Veracruz Exhibition Hall with 86,000-square-foot (8,000 m^{2}), a theater-styled capacity of 5,280, and 1,500-square-foot (140 m^{2}) of pre-function space in addition to 45 breakout rooms.

There is a business center located on site.
