= 2020 NBA Finals =

2020 basketball championship series

Team	Coach	Wins
Los Angeles Lakers	Frank Vogel	4
Miami Heat	Erik Spoelstra	2
- Dates: September 30 – October 11
- MVP: LeBron James (Los Angeles Lakers)
- Hall of Famers: Lakers: Dwight Howard (2025)
- Eastern finals: Heat defeated Celtics, 4–2
- Western finals: Lakers defeated Nuggets, 4–1

The 2020 NBA Finals was the championship series of the National Basketball Association's (NBA) 2019–20 season and conclusion of the season's playoffs. In this best-of-seven playoff series, the Western Conference champion Los Angeles Lakers defeated the Eastern Conference champion Miami Heat, 4–2 and 17th title overall in franchise history. The Los Angeles Lakers also became the first and only team in NBA history to be undefeated in a season when leading entering the fourth quarter, going a combined 57–0 record in the regular season and playoffs. The Lakers' LeBron James was named the NBA Finals Most Valuable Player (MVP) for the fourth time in his career. He became the first and only player in NBA history to be named Finals MVP with three different franchises (two with the Heat, one with the Cleveland Cavaliers, and one with the Lakers) and along with teammate Danny Green, jointly the third players to win the NBA Finals with three different teams. He won the Finals MVP award in a unanimous 11–0 vote by leading his team in points, rebounds, and assists for the entire series, after averaging 29.8 points, 11.8 rebounds, and 8.5 assists per game on the very efficient 59% shooting. Lakers president Jeanie Buss became the first female controlling owner to guide her team to an NBA title.

The Lakers were the No. 1 seed in the West, while the Heat were No. 5 in the East, becoming the third-lowest seed to advance to the Finals. This was the first NBA Finals matchup between the two teams, and the first time that Finals participants had both missed the playoffs in the previous season. James had previously played with Miami under Heat head coach Erik Spoelstra, winning back-to-back NBA titles in 2012 and 2013 in four consecutive Finals appearances from 2011 to 2014, while Heat president Pat Riley was head coach of the "Showtime"-era Lakers from 1981 to 1990, leading them to four NBA titles in seven Finals appearances. For the first time in six seasons, the Golden State Warriors were not in the Finals.

The Finals were originally scheduled for June, but the season was suspended in mid-March due to the COVID-19 pandemic. The NBA and its players later approved a plan to restart the season in late July, setting up the NBA Bubble at Walt Disney World to protect teams from the virus. The games were played in the Bubble behind closed doors at the ESPN Wide World of Sports Complex in Bay Lake, Florida, with the Finals being played from September 30 through October 11. The Finals marked the conclusion of the NBA Bubble, which recorded no COVID-19 cases for the participating teams. The 2020 Finals was the latest to begin (beating the 1999 edition which began on June 16) and the first one played in September and October, and as well held in the fall.

== Background ==
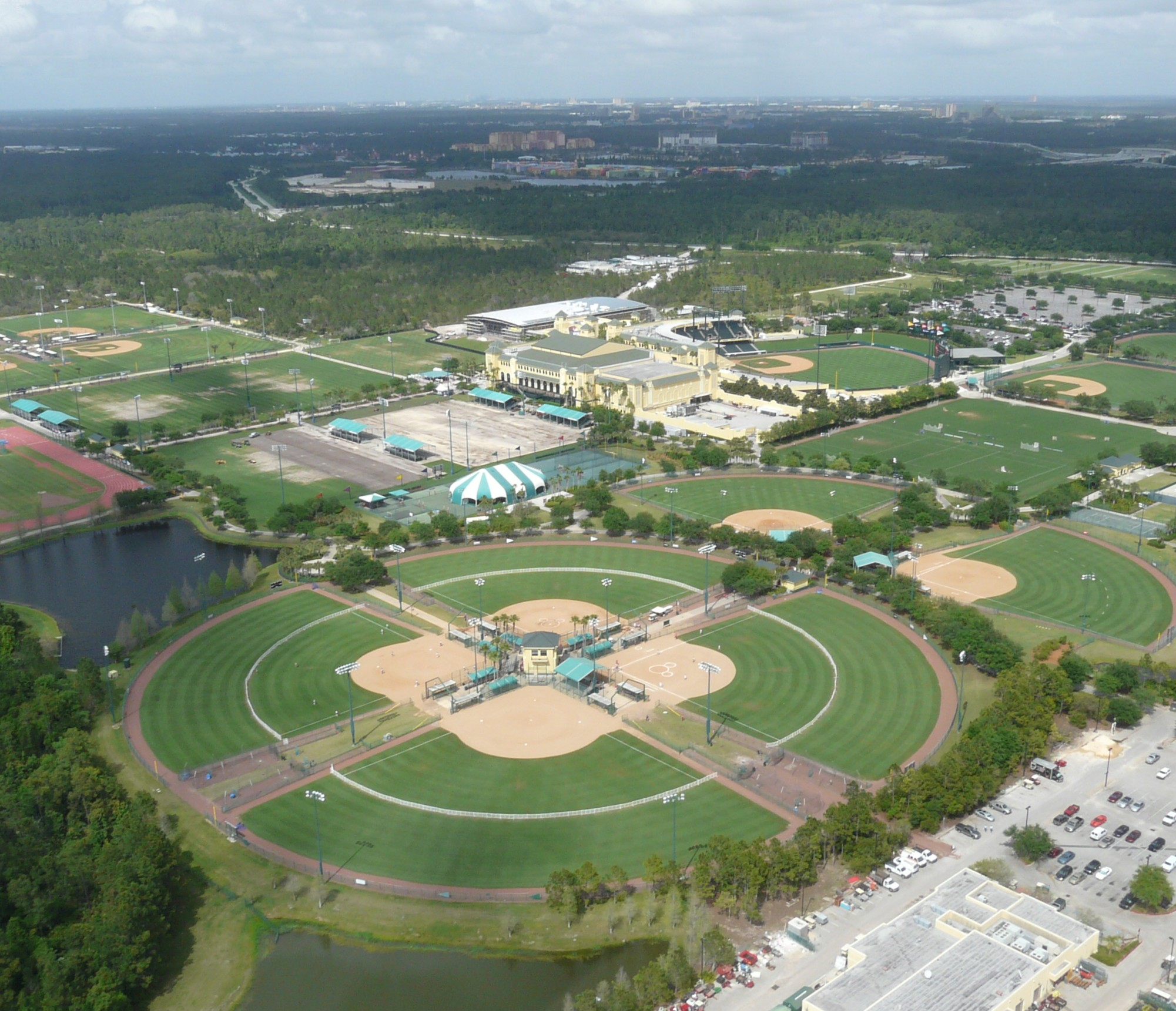
The ESPN Wide World of Sports Complex at Walt Disney World Resort in Bay Lake, Florida, hosted the 2020 NBA Finals.

=== Season suspension and restart ===
On March 11, 2020, the NBA announced the suspension of the 2019–20 season following a report that Utah Jazz All-Star center Rudy Gobert tested positive for COVID-19 just hours before the Jazz road game against the Oklahoma City Thunder. On June 4, the NBA Board of Governors approved 29–1 (the Portland Trail Blazers were the lone dissenter) resuming the 2019–20 season at Walt Disney World. The National Basketball Players Association approved the plan a day later. Under the plan, thirteen Western Conference teams and nine Eastern Conference teams, which include all clubs within six games of a playoff spot, played eight regular-season "seeding" games. A possible play-in tournament for the eighth seed in each conference would then be held if the ninth seed finished the regular season within four games of the eighth seed (this play-in tournament was used in the Western conference only). The 2020 NBA playoffs were then played as a conventional post-season tournament.

=== Miami Heat ===
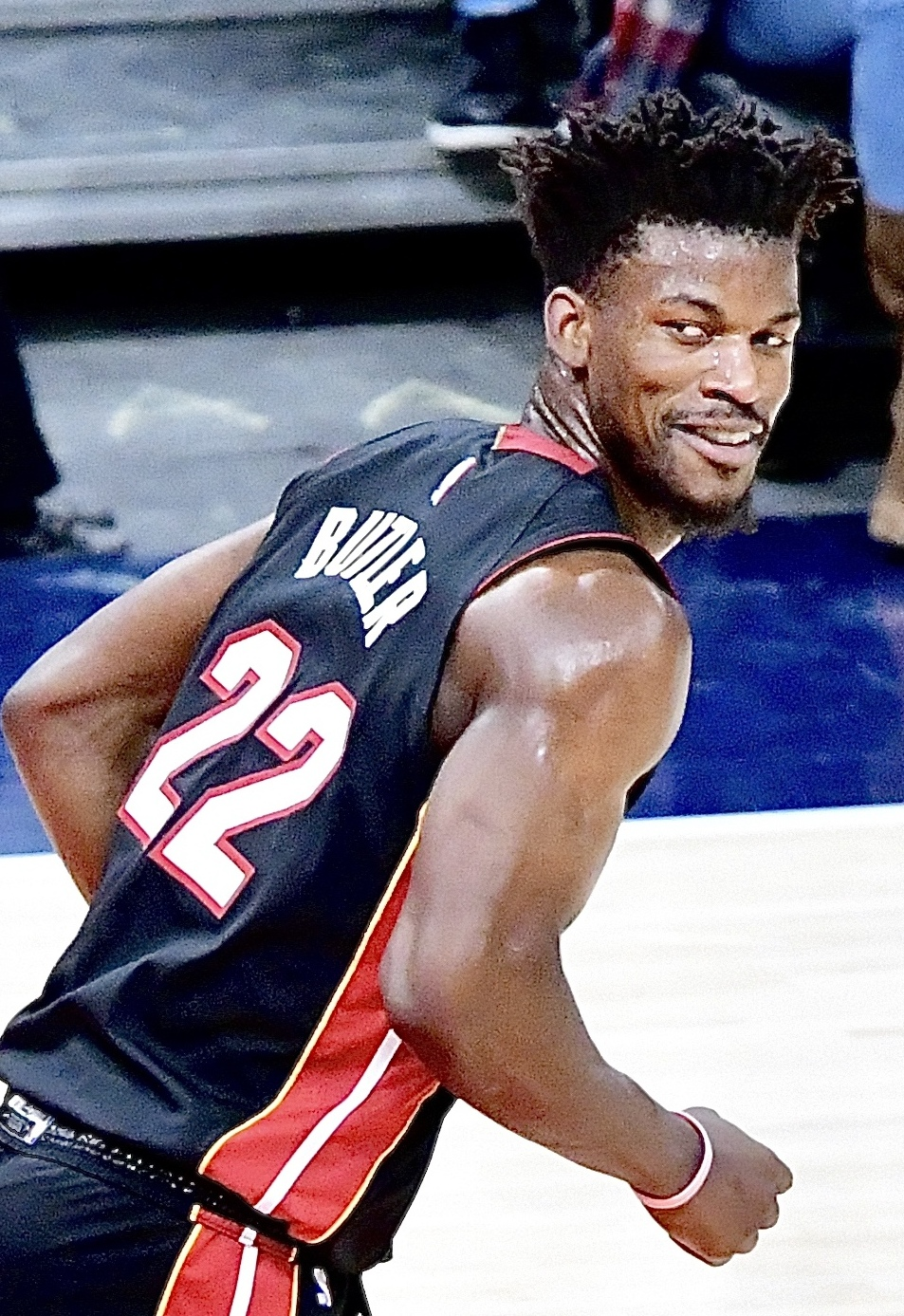
Jimmy Butler was traded to Miami in the offseason.

During the off-season, the Heat agreed to a four-way trade with the Los Angeles Clippers, Portland Trail Blazers, and the Philadelphia 76ers to acquire All-Star small forward Jimmy Butler from the 76ers.

Miami began the season with two undrafted players in their starting lineup, Kendrick Nunn and Duncan Robinson. In his first season with the Heat, Butler was named an All-Star for the fifth time in his career, and Bam Adebayo received his first selection, giving Miami two players in an All-Star Game for the first time since Chris Bosh and Dwyane Wade in the 2015–16 season. Before the season was suspended, the Heat clinched both their first playoff berth and Southeast Division title since the 2017–18 season. After the season resumed, they earned the fifth seed in the Eastern Conference. The Heat swept the Indiana Pacers in the first round of the playoffs, upset the No. 1 seed Milwaukee Bucks in five games in the Eastern Conference semifinals, and defeated the 3rd-seed Boston Celtics in six games in the Eastern Conference finals to become the first fifth-seeded team to reach the NBA Finals. Only three other times had a lower seed reached the Finals: the Houston Rockets at No. 6 in 1981 and 1995, and the No. 8 New York Knicks in 1999.

=== Los Angeles Lakers ===
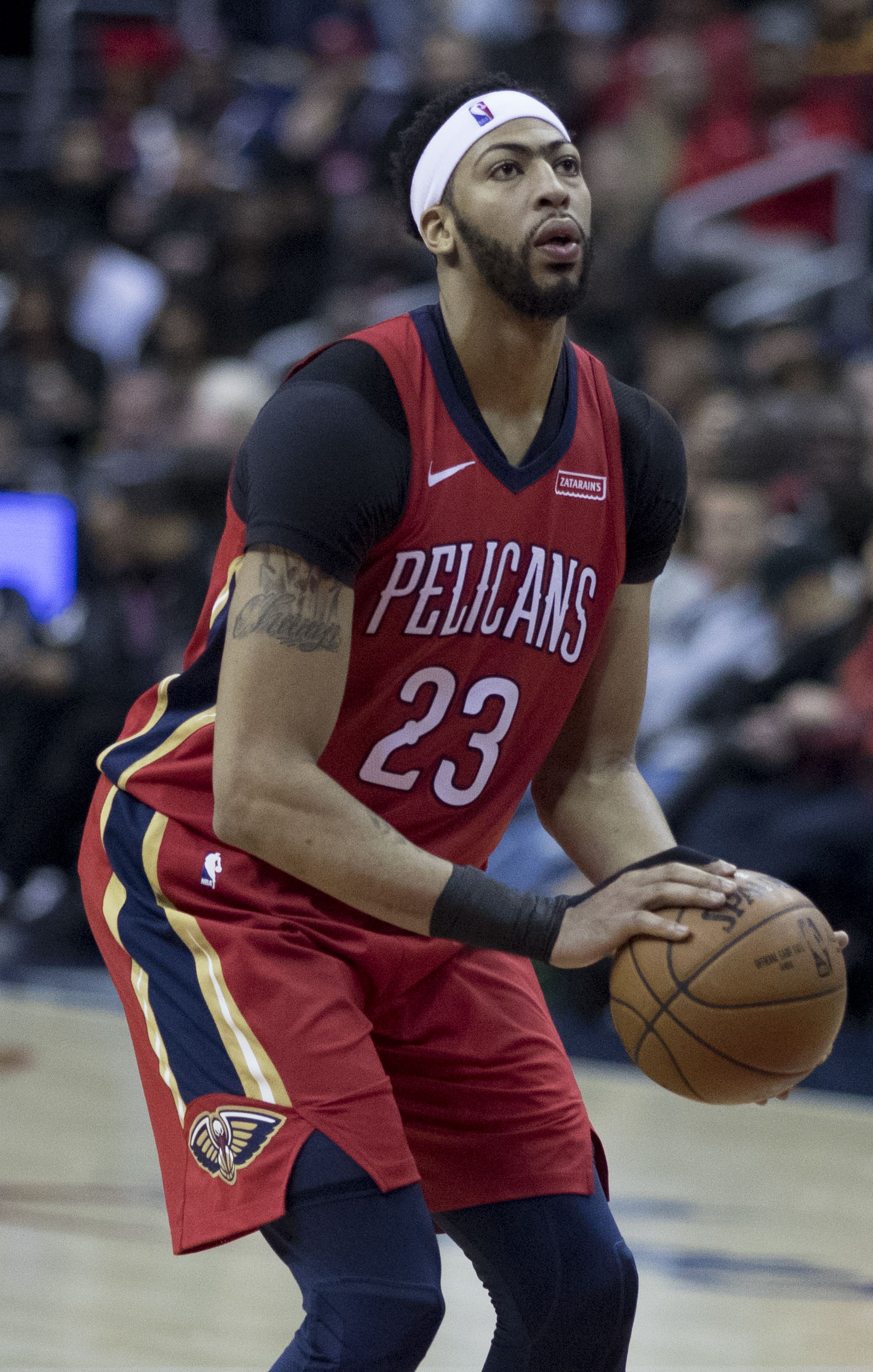
The Lakers traded for Anthony Davis from New Orleans in the offseason.

The Lakers were coming off of a disappointing season in 2018–19 in which they extended their playoff drought which began in 2014. Their major free agent acquisition, LeBron James, suffered the first major injury in his career, and he missed the playoffs for the first time since 2005. On the final day of the season, Magic Johnson resigned as president of basketball operations, and head coach Luke Walton and the team mutually agreed to part ways a few days later. During the offseason, general manager Rob Pelinka hired Frank Vogel as the Lakers' new head coach, and he acquired six-time All-Star power forward Anthony Davis from the New Orleans Pelicans in a three-way trade that also included the Washington Wizards. Pelinka was promoted to vice president of basketball operations in January 2020, while still retaining his GM role. Later in the month, legendary former Lakers guard Kobe Bryant was killed in a helicopter crash along with his 13-year-old daughter Gianna and seven others. The Lakers dedicated the season to him.

The Lakers clinched their first playoff berth since the 2012–13 season in March 2020, days before the season was suspended. It ended the longest drought in the franchise's history. After play resumed in the bubble, the Lakers clinched both their first Pacific Division title since 2012 and the top seed in the Western Conference playoffs for the first time since the 2009–10 season. James and Davis were runner-ups for the NBA Most Valuable Player and NBA Defensive Player of the Year Award, respectively, behind Giannis Antetokounmpo, and both were named to the All-NBA First Team.

The Lakers needed five games each to defeat the Portland Trail Blazers in the first round of the playoffs, the Houston Rockets in the Western Conference semifinals, and the Denver Nuggets in the Western Conference finals. The Lakers reached the Finals for the first time since 2010, while James was making his ninth trip in 10 seasons.

=== Road to the Finals ===
Miami Heat (Eastern Conference champion)		Los Angeles Lakers (Western Conference champion)
Eastern Conference: # / Team / W / L / PCT / GB / GP; 1 / z – Milwaukee Bucks * / 56 / 17 / .767 / – / 73; 2 / y – Toronto Raptors * / 53 / 19 / .736 / 2.5 / 72; 3 / x – Boston Celtics / 48 / 24 / .667 / 7.5 / 72; 4 / x – Indiana Pacers / 45 / 28 / .616 / 11.0 / 73; 5 / y – Miami Heat * / 44 / 29 / .603 / 12.0 / 73; 6 / x – Philadelphia 76ers / 43 / 30 / .589 / 13.0 / 73; 7 / x – Brooklyn Nets / 35 / 37 / .486 / 20.5 / 72; 8 / x – Orlando Magic / 33 / 40 / .452 / 23.0 / 73; 9 / Washington Wizards / 25 / 47 / .347 / 30.5 / 72; 10 / Charlotte Hornets / 23 / 42 / .354 / 29.0 / 65; 11 / Chicago Bulls / 22 / 43 / .338 / 30.0 / 65; 12 / New York Knicks / 21 / 45 / .318 / 31.5 / 66; 13 / Detroit Pistons / 20 / 46 / .303 / 32.5 / 66; 14 / Atlanta Hawks / 20 / 47 / .299 / 33.0 / 67; 15 / Cleveland Cavaliers / 19 / 46 / .292 / 33.0 / 65	Regular season	Western Conference: # / Team / W / L / PCT / GB / GP; 1 / c – Los Angeles Lakers * / 52 / 19 / .732 / – / 71; 2 / x – Los Angeles Clippers / 49 / 23 / .681 / 3.5 / 72; 3 / y – Denver Nuggets * / 46 / 27 / .630 / 7.0 / 73; 4 / y – Houston Rockets * / 44 / 28 / .611 / 8.5 / 72; 5 / x – Oklahoma City Thunder / 44 / 28 / .611 / 8.5 / 72; 6 / x – Utah Jazz / 44 / 28 / .611 / 8.5 / 72; 7 / x – Dallas Mavericks / 43 / 32 / .573 / 11.0 / 75; 8 / x – Portland Trail Blazers / 35 / 39 / .473 / 18.5 / 74; 9 / pi – Memphis Grizzlies / 34 / 39 / .466 / 19.0 / 73; 10 / Phoenix Suns / 34 / 39 / .466 / 19.0 / 73; 11 / San Antonio Spurs / 32 / 39 / .451 / 20.0 / 71; 12 / Sacramento Kings / 31 / 41 / .431 / 21.5 / 72; 13 / New Orleans Pelicans / 30 / 42 / .417 / 22.5 / 72; 14 / Minnesota Timberwolves / 19 / 45 / .297 / 29.5 / 64; 15 / Golden State Warriors / 15 / 50 / .231 / 34.0 / 65
Defeated the 4th seeded Indiana Pacers, 4–0	First round	Defeated the 8th seeded Portland Trail Blazers, 4–1
Defeated the 1st seeded Milwaukee Bucks, 4–1	Conference semifinals	Defeated the 4th seeded Houston Rockets, 4–1
Defeated the 3rd seeded Boston Celtics, 4–2	Conference finals	Defeated the 3rd seeded Denver Nuggets, 4–1

=== Regular season series ===
The Lakers won the regular season series 2–0.

November 8, 2019

Recap

Miami Heat 80, Los Angeles Lakers 95

Staples Center, Los Angeles, California

December 13, 2019

Recap

Los Angeles Lakers 113, Miami Heat 110

American Airlines Arena, Miami, Florida

== Series summary ==
For this season only, Sunday games began at 7:30 p.m. ET instead of its traditional 8:00 p.m. ET start time.

Game	Date	Road team (Note: Since all games were played at a neutral site with no spectators, the home and road teams were labeled with a logo of their team as the court decals.)	Result	Home team
Game 1	September 30	Miami Heat	98–116 (0–1)	Los Angeles Lakers
Game 2	October 2	Miami Heat	114–124 (0–2)	Los Angeles Lakers
Game 3	October 4	Los Angeles Lakers	104–115 (2–1)	Miami Heat
Game 4	October 6	Los Angeles Lakers	102–96 (3–1)	Miami Heat
Game 5	October 9	Miami Heat	111–108 (2–3)	Los Angeles Lakers
Game 6	October 11	Los Angeles Lakers	106–93 (4–2)	Miami Heat

== Game summaries ==
=== Game 1 ===
ABC

September 30
9:00 pm

Recap

Miami Heat 98, Los Angeles Lakers 116
Scoring by quarter: 28–31, 20–34, 19–28, 31–23
Pts: Jimmy Butler 23; Rebs: Olynyk, Iguodala, Nunn 5 each Asts: Andre Iguodala 6	Pts: Anthony Davis 34; Rebs: LeBron James 13; Asts: LeBron James 9
Los Angeles leads series, 1–0

AdventHealth Arena at ESPN Wide World of Sports Complex, Bay Lake, Florida
Referees:
- No. 8 Marc Davis
- No. 5 Kane Fitzgerald
- No. 58 Josh Tiven

The Lakers' Anthony Davis had 34 points, nine rebounds and five assists in his first Finals game, and LeBron James added a near triple-double with 25 points, 13 rebounds and nine assists to lead Los Angeles to a 116–98 win over Miami. The Heat led 23–10 in the middle of the first quarter before the Lakers outscored them 55–25 to lead by 17 at halftime. The Lakers expanded their lead to as high as 32 points in the third quarter. They made 13 of their first 20 three-point field goals in the game before cooling off and missing 16 of their last 18.

Miami's Jimmy Butler twisted his left ankle before the end of the first half, but he remained in the game and finished with 23 points. Heat guard Goran Dragić did not play in the second half due to a foot injury. Miami center Bam Adebayo also did not finish the game after exiting in the third quarter with a shoulder injury. Dwight Howard remained as the Lakers' starting center after he moved into the starting lineup for the last few games of the conference finals against Denver.

=== Game 2 ===
ABC

October 2
9:00 pm

Recap

Miami Heat 114, Los Angeles Lakers 124
Scoring by quarter: 23–29, 31–39, 39–35, 21–21
Pts: Jimmy Butler 25; Rebs: Kelly Olynyk 9 Asts: Jimmy Butler 13	Pts: LeBron James 33; Rebs: Anthony Davis 14; Asts: Rajon Rondo 10
Los Angeles leads series, 2–0

AdventHealth Arena, Bay Lake, Florida
Referees:
- No. 19 James Capers
- No. 16 David Guthrie
- No. 42 Eric Lewis

James scored 33 points and Davis added 32, leading the Lakers to a 2–0 series lead with a 124–114 win over the Heat. James and Davis became the first pair of Lakers teammates to each score 30 points in a Finals game since Kobe Bryant and Shaquille O'Neal in Game 3 of the 2002 NBA Finals. The team shot 51% for the game and made 22 of their first 25 two-point field goals, including a stretch of 16 straight towards the end of the first period through late in the third. Davis made 14 of his first 15 shots. Miami played short-handed without their injured starters Adebayo (neck and left shoulder) and Dragić (torn left plantar fascia).

The Lakers led by six points after the first quarter even though they made just three of 12 three-point attempts. Trailing by 14 at the half, the Heat scored 39 points in the third period but still were down 10 entering the fourth. They never got closer than 10 in the final period. Rajon Rondo had 16 points, while Kentavious Caldwell-Pope and Kyle Kuzma also added 11 for the Lakers. The Lakers made 16 out of a season-high 47 three-pointers. Their starters made just seven of 28 with Caldwell-Pope and Danny Green combining to make three of 19. The team made 66% of its two-point attempts.

Miami was led by Butler with 25 points and Kelly Olynyk with 24 off the bench. Tyler Herro and Meyers Leonard replaced Dragić and Adebayo in the starting lineup. Herro became the youngest player to start an NBA Finals game at 20 years, 256 days. He was eight days younger than Magic Johnson was when he started Game 1 for the Lakers in 1980 against the Philadelphia 76ers.

=== Game 3 ===
ABC

October 4
7:30 pm

Recap

Los Angeles Lakers 104, Miami Heat 115
Scoring by quarter: 23–26, 31–32, 26–27, 24–30
Pts: LeBron James 25; Rebs: LeBron James 10; Asts: LeBron James 8	Pts: Jimmy Butler 40; Rebs: Jimmy Butler 11; Asts: Jimmy Butler 13
Los Angeles leads series, 2–1

AdventHealth Arena, Bay Lake, Florida
Referees:
- No. 48 Scott Foster
- No. 25 Tony Brothers
- No. 26 Pat Fraher

Butler finished with 40 points, 11 rebounds and 13 assists for a triple-double to lead Miami to a 115–104 win as Heat starters Adebayo and Dragić remained sidelined. Miami led for most of the game. At multiple points, they looked to be taking control of the game, but the Lakers would answer. The Heat led by 13 in the first quarter before the Lakers rallied to take the lead five minutes later. Miami began the second half with a 10–0 run to lead by 14, but Los Angeles responded with eight straight points. The Heat were up 12 late in the third quarter before the Lakers outscored them 20–6 to regain the lead 91–89 with 8:55 remaining in the game. However, the Heat outscored the Lakers 26–13 to finish the game and cut the Lakers' lead to 2–1.

Game 3 was the first NBA Finals game Miami had won since Game 2 of 2014. Butler became the third player in Finals history to record a 40+ point triple-double, joining James (then with the Cleveland Cavaliers) in 2015 and Jerry West with the Lakers in 1969. Butler also became the first player to have more points, rebounds and assists in a Finals game than James, who finished with 25 points, 10 rebounds and eight assists. Davis, who was in foul trouble early, was held to just 15 points and five rebounds. The Lakers committed 20 turnovers, which led to 21 points for the Heat. Los Angeles had 10 turnovers in the first quarter, the most of any team in the league during the season in the first period, including eight combined by James and Davis, who ended the game with eight and five turnovers, respectively. Herro and Olynyk both scored 17 points for Miami, while Kyle Kuzma and Markieff Morris both had 19 points off the bench for the Lakers. Miami's starters outscored the Lakers' starters 89–51.

=== Game 4 ===
ABC

October 6
9:00 pm

Recap

Los Angeles Lakers 102, Miami Heat 96
Scoring by quarter: 27–22, 22–25, 26–23, 27–26
Pts: LeBron James 28; Rebs: LeBron James 12; Asts: LeBron James 8	Pts: Jimmy Butler 22; Rebs: Jimmy Butler 10; Asts: Jimmy Butler 9
Los Angeles leads series, 3–1

AdventHealth Arena, Bay Lake, Florida
Referees:
- No. 15 Zach Zarba
- No. 30 John Goble
- No. 6 Tony Brown

Davis made a 3-pointer with 39.5 seconds remaining to give the Lakers a nine-point lead and securing the game en route to a 102–96 win and a 3–1 lead over the Heat. James had 28 points, eight assists and 12 rebounds, while Davis finished with 22 points, four assists and nine rebounds. Los Angeles was sloppy again with nine first-half turnovers, including five by James alone. With 8:18 remaining in the third quarter, James made a 3-pointer which put the Lakers ahead 55–54. The Lakers did not trail for the final 20 minutes, though Miami would remain close throughout. With 3:05 left in the game, Butler shot a corner 3-pointer that rimmed out which would have given the Heat the lead. Seven seconds later, Caldwell-Pope made a corner 3 to give the Lakers a 93–88 lead. Miami then committed a shot-clock violation, and Caldwell-Pope drove for a basket for a seven-point lead.

Caldwell-Pope contributed 15 points and Green scored 10 for the Lakers. Butler ended with 22 points, nine assists and 10 rebounds for the Heat. He made his first five shots for 11 points in the first quarter but did not make another field goal until the fourth quarter while being guarded by Davis and James. Herro had 21 points, Duncan Robinson scored 17 and Adebayo added 15 for the Heat after missing two games.

=== Game 5 ===
ABC

October 9
9:00 pm

Recap

Miami Heat 111, Los Angeles Lakers 108
Scoring by quarter: 25–24, 35–32, 28–26, 23–26
Pts: Jimmy Butler 35; Rebs: Jimmy Butler 12; Asts: Jimmy Butler 11	Pts: LeBron James 40; Rebs: LeBron James 13; Asts: LeBron James 7
Los Angeles leads series, 3–2

AdventHealth Arena, Bay Lake, Florida
Referees:
- No. 8 Marc Davis
- No. 5 Kane Fitzgerald
- No. 42 Eric Lewis

Butler had 35 points, 12 rebounds and 11 assists to lead Miami to a 111–108 win and stave off elimination, bringing the series to 3–2. The Heat weathered a dominant performance by James, who ended with 40 points on just 21 shots, 13 rebounds and seven assists. With the Lakers down by one and 18.8 seconds remaining in the game, James drove into the paint, where he was surrounded by Butler and Robinson with a third defender also approaching. James passed to a wide-open Green at the top of the key, but Green missed a 3-pointer with 7.1 seconds left. Morris got the offensive rebound, pump-faked, but then threw the ball out of bounds with 2.2 seconds remaining in an attempt to get the ball to Davis under the basket.

With 48 seconds left in the first quarter, Davis was kicked by Miami's Andre Iguodala in his right heel, which aggravated a contusion he received in the conference finals. After lying on the floor for minutes, Davis exited the game and began the second quarter on the bench, which helped the Heat amass a 11-point lead. The Lakers drew close to make it 60–56 at the half. Caldwell-Pope, who scored 16 points, made a 3-pointer to give the Lakers the lead in the fourth quarter. With 3:13 remaining, Robinson made a three-pointer to give the Heat a two-point lead, which began a run of either a tie or a lead change on the game's next nine scoring possessions, including six straight where James and Butler traded scores.

Robinson ended with 26 points, including seven 3-pointers, which broke Gary Neal's record set in 2013 for most 3's by an undrafted player in the Finals. Butler was exhausted towards the end, having rested just 48 seconds all game while also guarding James and sometimes Davis on defense. He became the second player with multiple 30-point triple-doubles in the same Finals series, joining James in 2015. Butler was the sixth player with multiple triple-doubles in the same Finals series along with James, Magic Johnson, Larry Bird, Wilt Chamberlain and Draymond Green. He also became the first with 35 points, 10 rebounds, 10 assists and five steals in a Finals game, and he was just the second NBA player to reach those marks in the playoffs, joining Gary Payton in 2000. Davis scored 28 points and added 12 rebounds for the Lakers. By the end of the game, he was noticeably limping after another tumble around the basket. He and James scored 68 of the team's 108 points. They combined to shoot 24 for 36, while the other Lakers were 14 for 46.

=== Game 6 ===
ABC

October 11
7:30 pm

Recap

Los Angeles Lakers 106, Miami Heat 93
Scoring by quarter: 28–20, 36–16, 23–22, 19–35
Pts: LeBron James 28; Rebs: Anthony Davis 15; Asts: LeBron James 10	Pts: Bam Adebayo 25; Rebs: Bam Adebayo 10; Asts: Jimmy Butler 8
Los Angeles wins NBA Finals, 4–2

AdventHealth Arena, Bay Lake, Florida
Referees:
- No. 19 James Capers
- No. 25 Tony Brothers
- No. 16 David Guthrie

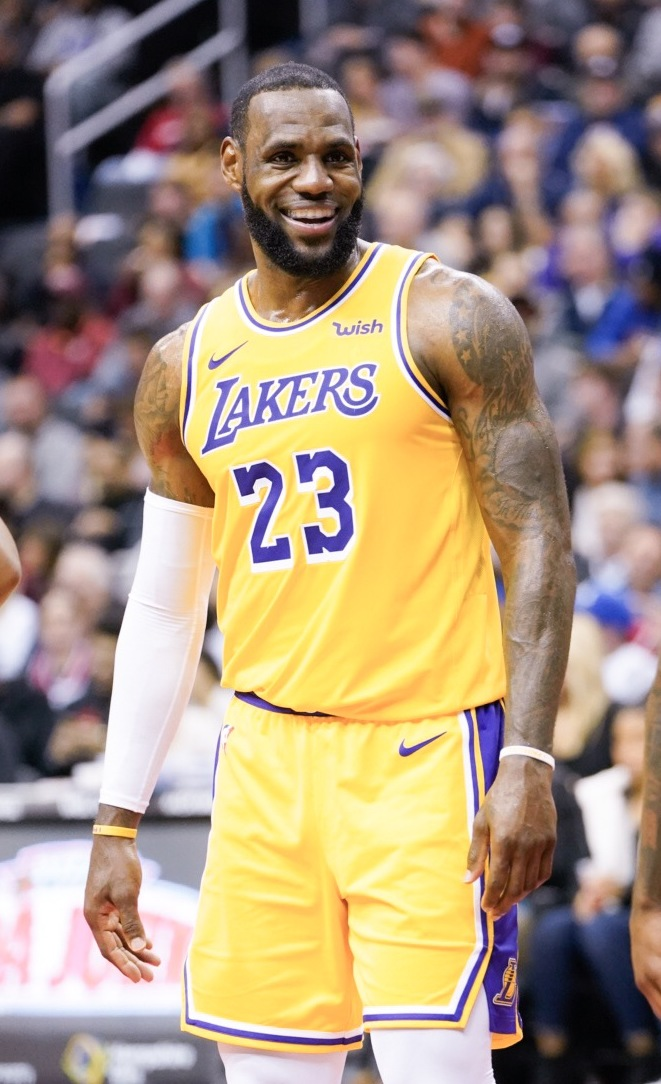
LeBron James was named Finals MVP for the fourth time in his career.

James had 28 points, 14 rebounds and 10 assists to lead the Lakers to a 106–93 win for their 17th league championship in franchise history, their first since 2010 and their first without Phil Jackson at the helm since his permanent departure in 2011. James was named the Finals MVP for the fourth time in his career. Winning the fourth championship of his career, he became the first and only player in NBA history to have been named Finals MVP with three different franchises. He won the award in a unanimous 11–0 vote.

Lakers head coach Frank Vogel decided to start with a smaller, quicker lineup, inserting guard Alex Caruso for Howard and moving Davis to center. Los Angeles never trailed in the game and ended the first quarter ahead 28–20. They outscored Miami 36–16 in the second period and led by as many as 30 points in the first half. The Lakers' 64–36 halftime lead was the second-largest margin at halftime in Finals history, behind a 30-point lead by Boston over the Lakers in Game 1 in 1985.

Davis had 19 points and 15 rebounds. Adebayo led Miami with 25 points and 10 rebounds. Butler was held to only 12 points, but added eight assists and seven rebounds. Dragić, who returned from his Game 1 injury, had five points off the bench on 2-of-8 shooting along with five rebounds in 19 minutes.

James ended the series averaging 29.8 points, 11.8 rebounds and 8.5 assists per game. He and Davis became the first teammates in NBA history to both average 25 points and shoot 50% from the field in the same postseason. Butler became only the second player in a Finals series to lead his team outright in points, rebounds, assists, steals and blocks, joining James in 2016 with the Cavaliers.

With the Dodgers winning the World Series later in the month, Los Angeles repeated its achievement of having NBA and World Series champions in the same year, as both the Lakers and Dodgers had won in 1988.

== Rosters ==
=== Los Angeles Lakers ===
2019–20 Los Angeles Lakers roster
Players

Pos.	No.	Player	Height	Weight	DOB	From
F	37	Kostas Antetokounmpo (TW)	6 ft 10 in (2.08 m)	200 lb (91 kg)	1997–11–20	Dayton
G	11	Avery Bradley (L)	6 ft 3 in (1.91 m)	180 lb (82 kg)	1990–11–26	Texas
F	12	Devontae Cacok (TW)	6 ft 8 in (2.03 m)	240 lb (109 kg)	1996–10–08	UNC Wilmington
G	1	Kentavious Caldwell-Pope	6 ft 5 in (1.96 m)	204 lb (93 kg)	1993–02–18	Georgia
G	4	Alex Caruso	6 ft 5 in (1.96 m)	186 lb (84 kg)	1994–02–28	Texas A&M
G	2	Quinn Cook	6 ft 1 in (1.85 m)	180 lb (82 kg)	1993–03–23	Duke
F/C	3	Anthony Davis	6 ft 10 in (2.08 m)	253 lb (115 kg)	1993–03–11	Kentucky
F	10	Jared Dudley	6 ft 6 in (1.98 m)	237 lb (108 kg)	1985–07–10	Boston College
G/F	14	Danny Green	6 ft 6 in (1.98 m)	215 lb (98 kg)	1987–06–22	North Carolina
G	5	Talen Horton-Tucker	6 ft 4 in (1.93 m)	234 lb (106 kg)	2000–11–25	Iowa State
C	39	Dwight Howard	6 ft 10 in (2.08 m)	265 lb (120 kg)	1985–12–08	SW Atlanta Academy (GA)
F	23	LeBron James	6 ft 9 in (2.06 m)	250 lb (113 kg)	1984–12–30	St. Vincent–St. Mary HS (OH)
F	0	Kyle Kuzma	6 ft 8 in (2.03 m)	221 lb (100 kg)	1995–07–24	Utah
C	7	JaVale McGee	7 ft 0 in (2.13 m)	270 lb (122 kg)	1988–01–19	Nevada
F	88	Markieff Morris	6 ft 8 in (2.03 m)	245 lb (111 kg)	1989–09–02	Kansas
G	9	Rajon Rondo	6 ft 1 in (1.85 m)	180 lb (82 kg)	1986–02–22	Kentucky
G/F	21	J. R. Smith	6 ft 6 in (1.98 m)	225 lb (102 kg)	1985–09–09	Saint Benedict's Prep (NJ)
G	18	Dion Waiters	6 ft 3 in (1.91 m)	210 lb (95 kg)	1991–12–10	Syracuse

Coaches
Head coach
- Frank Vogel
Assistant(s)
- Quinton Crawford
- Phil Handy
- Lionel Hollins
- Jason Kidd
- Mike Penberthy
- Miles Simon

Legend
- (DP) Unsigned draft pick
- (FA) Free agent
- (S) Suspended
- (GL) On assignment to G League affiliate
- (TW) Two-way affiliate player
- (L) On leave from the team
- Injured

Roster
Updated: July 13, 2020

=== Miami Heat ===
2019–20 Miami Heat roster
Players

Pos.	No.	Player	Height	Weight	DOB	From
F/C	13	Bam Adebayo	6 ft 9 in (2.06 m)	255 lb (116 kg)	1997–07–18	Kentucky
F/C	17	Kyle Alexander (TW)	6 ft 10 in (2.08 m)	216 lb (98 kg)	1996–10–21	Tennessee
F	22	Jimmy Butler	6 ft 7 in (2.01 m)	230 lb (104 kg)	1989–09–14	Marquette
F	99	Jae Crowder	6 ft 6 in (1.98 m)	235 lb (107 kg)	1990–07–06	Marquette
G	7	Goran Dragić	6 ft 3 in (1.91 m)	190 lb (86 kg)	1986–05–06	Slovenia
F	40	Udonis Haslem	6 ft 8 in (2.03 m)	235 lb (107 kg)	1980–06–09	Florida
G	14	Tyler Herro	6 ft 5 in (1.96 m)	195 lb (88 kg)	2000–01–20	Kentucky
F	44	Solomon Hill	6 ft 6 in (1.98 m)	226 lb (103 kg)	1991–03–18	Arizona
G/F	28	Andre Iguodala	6 ft 6 in (1.98 m)	215 lb (98 kg)	1984–01–28	Arizona
F	5	Derrick Jones	6 ft 6 in (1.98 m)	210 lb (95 kg)	1997–02–15	UNLV
F/C	0	Meyers Leonard	7 ft 0 in (2.13 m)	260 lb (118 kg)	1992–02–27	Illinois
G	25	Kendrick Nunn	6 ft 2 in (1.88 m)	190 lb (86 kg)	1995–08–03	Oakland
G/F	4	KZ Okpala	6 ft 8 in (2.03 m)	215 lb (98 kg)	1999–04–28	Stanford
F/C	9	Kelly Olynyk	6 ft 11 in (2.11 m)	240 lb (109 kg)	1991–04–19	Gonzaga
F	55	Duncan Robinson	6 ft 7 in (2.01 m)	215 lb (98 kg)	1994–04–22	Michigan
F	30	Chris Silva	6 ft 8 in (2.03 m)	234 lb (106 kg)	1996–09–19	South Carolina
G	2	Gabe Vincent (TW)	6 ft 3 in (1.91 m)	200 lb (91 kg)	1996–06–14	UC Santa Barbara

Coaches
Head coach
- Erik Spoelstra
Assistant(s)
- Malik Allen
- Dan Craig
- Octavio De La Grana
- Chris Quinn

Legend
- (DP) Unsigned draft pick
- (FA) Free agent
- (S) Suspended
- (GL) On assignment to G League affiliate
- (TW) Two-way affiliate player
- Injured

Roster
Updated: November 30, 2019

== Player statistics ==
Legend
GP	Games played	GS	Games started	MPG	Minutes per game
FG%	Field-goal percentage	3P%	3-point field-goal percentage	FT%	Free-throw percentage
RPG	Rebounds per game	APG	Assists per game	SPG	Steals per game
BPG	Blocks per game	PPG	Points per game

Los Angeles Lakers statistics
Player	GP	GS	MPG	FG%	3P%	FT%	RPG	APG	SPG	BPG	PPG
LeBron James	6	6	**39.4**	.591	.417	.667	**11.8**	**8.5**	1.2	0.5	**29.8**
Anthony Davis	6	6	38.2	.571	.421	.938	10.7	3.2	**1.3**	**2.0**	25.0
Kentavious Caldwell-Pope	6	6	31.3	.377	.302	.857	2.8	2.0	1.0	0.2	12.8
Rajon Rondo	6	0	26.0	.388	.333	.875	5.5	5.8	1.0	0.0	8.7
Kyle Kuzma	6	0	21.6	.354	.310	.800	2.8	0.5	0.2	0.2	8.5
Danny Green	6	6	22.9	.327	.289	**1.000**	2.8	1.2	1.0	0.8	7.5
Markieff Morris	6	0	21.3	.368	.400	.833	3.3	1.2	0.0	0.0	7.5
Alex Caruso	6	1	24.9	.433	.375	.750	2.5	2.3	0.8	0.2	6.3
Dwight Howard	6	5	11.8	**.750**	**1.000**	.571	2.8	0.7	0.2	0.3	2.8
Quinn Cook	2	0	1.4	.500	.500	.000	0.0	0.0	0.0	0.0	1.5
J. R. Smith	3	0	3.4	.333	.333	.000	0.3	0.0	0.3	0.0	1.0
Jared Dudley	3	0	0.9	.000	.000	.000	0.0	0.0	0.0	0.3	0.0

Miami Heat statistics
Player	GP	GS	MPG	FG%	3P%	FT%	RPG	APG	SPG	BPG	PPG
Jimmy Butler	6	6	**43.0**	.552	.308	.887	**8.3**	**9.8**	**2.2**	**0.8**	**26.2**
Bam Adebayo	4	4	33.7	.535	.000	.625	6.3	2.5	0.3	**0.8**	15.3
Tyler Herro	6	5	34.6	.368	.367	.813	4.2	3.0	0.5	0.0	14.7
Duncan Robinson	6	6	32.0	.404	.391	**1.000**	2.7	2.5	0.8	0.3	12.5
Kelly Olynyk	5	0	22.7	.488	.412	.846	6.0	1.4	0.4	0.6	11.6
Jae Crowder	6	6	31.5	.418	.333	.800	5.2	1.2	0.3	0.5	11.2
Kendrick Nunn	6	0	22.6	.471	.391	**1.000**	3.5	1.8	0.0	0.2	10.5
Meyers Leonard	2	2	11.0	**.833**	**1.000**	**1.000**	0.5	0.5	0.5	0.0	7.0
Goran Dragić	2	1	16.9	.313	.000	.500	3.0	2.5	1.5	0.0	5.5
Andre Iguodala	6	0	19.7	.421	.375	.000	2.7	2.0	0.3	0.3	3.2
Solomon Hill	4	0	6.3	.556	.333	.000	0.8	0.3	0.3	0.0	3.0
Derrick Jones Jr.	4	0	2.5	.500	.000	.000	0.3	0.0	0.0	0.0	0.5

- Bold: team high

== Sponsorship ==
As part of a multiyear partnership that began in 2018, the internet television service YouTube TV was the presenting sponsor of the series. The 2020 NBA Finals Presented by YouTube TV logo was prominently displayed at center court, with "Black Lives Matter" text featured above the midcourt logo (as it had been since the start of the NBA Bubble as part of the league and players' activism in response to the George Floyd protests), while Walt Disney World script logos were placed outside opposing lane lines on each side.

== Media coverage ==
In the United States, the Finals were televised by ABC in English (including O&O KABC-TV in Los Angeles and local station WPLG in Miami) and ESPN Deportes in Spanish.

Like before, Mike Breen, Mark Jackson and Jeff Van Gundy served as commentators on ABC, with Rachel Nichols on the sideline. After spending the past 11 Finals as a sideline reporter on television, Doris Burke joined the ESPN Radio commentary team, which included Marc Kestecher and Jon Barry, making her first woman to call the NBA Finals on the radio.

Game 5 of the Finals was the first NBA game to be aired on China Central Television (CCTV) in China since the disagreement between the NBA and that country over the Houston Rockets General Manager Daryl Morey tweet in support of the Hong Kong anti-government protesters. NBA games had remained available for streaming on Tencent.

=== Viewership ===
The 2020 NBA Finals continued the trend of declining viewership, with 7.41 million people watching Game 1, making it the lowest rated and least-watched NBA Finals game on record (tracking viewership started in 1988). It aired opposite two Major League Baseball playoff games. The drop followed the shift in other sporting events rescheduled from their traditional times of year, such as the Stanley Cup Finals, the Kentucky Derby, the U.S. Open and the Indianapolis 500. The viewership further declined to a new record low of 6.609 million for Game 2. Despite the lows, both Game 1 and Game 2 were the most watched program for their respective days. Game 3, which aired opposite NBC's Sunday Night Football coverage, had its viewership continue to decrease to a new record low of approximately 5.94 million.

Game	Ratings (American households)	American audience (in millions)	Ref
1	4.1	7.41	
2	3.6	6.61	
3	3.1	5.94	
4	4.4	7.54	
5	4.8	8.89	
6	4.2	8.29	
Avg	4.0	7.45	

== Aftermath ==
Following the Los Angeles Lakers' victory, Cinderella Castle at Walt Disney World Resort lit up in their team colors. The local victory parade for the Lakers was delayed due to the COVID-19 pandemic. Los Angeles mayor Eric Garcetti stated on October 28, the day after the Los Angeles Dodgers won the World Series, that there would be separate public celebrations for both teams, though it was uncertain how mandated social distancing would be addressed. As of November 2024, no public celebrations have taken place for either team, although there was a parade celebrating the Dodgers 2024 World Series championship.

The following 2020–21 season began on December 22, 72 days after the Lakers won the championship. The extremely short offseason proved detrimental for both the Heat and the Lakers. Los Angeles finished the 72-game schedule at 42–30, seventh in the Western Conference, while Miami went 40–32 to finish sixth in the Eastern Conference. Injuries to LeBron James and Anthony Davis, among others, derailed the Lakers' season. After defeating the Golden State Warriors in the play-in tournament and qualified for the 2021 NBA playoffs, the Lakers lost in the first round to the Phoenix Suns 4–2. It marked the first time LeBron James failed to win a single playoff series in a season. Meanwhile, the Heat were swept by the eventual champion Milwaukee Bucks in the first round.

Both teams came close to meeting again in the 2023 NBA Finals; both the Heat and the Lakers became the first teams to win a playoff series after qualifying in the play-in tournament. But while the eighth-seeded Heat reached the NBA Finals, the seventh-seeded Lakers lost in the Western Conference Finals to the Denver Nuggets, who went on to win that year's championship. En route to the Finals, the Heat replicated their feat of upsetting the Bucks, this time in the first round, as well as defeating the Celtics again in the Eastern Conference Finals, this time in seven games.
