= Van Leeuwen Ice Cream =

American ice cream parlor chain

Van Leeuwen
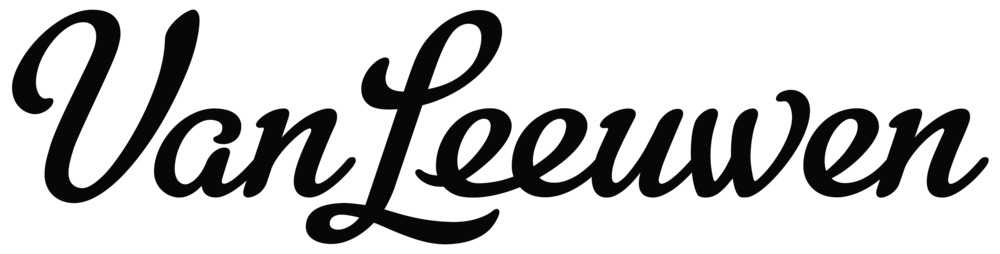

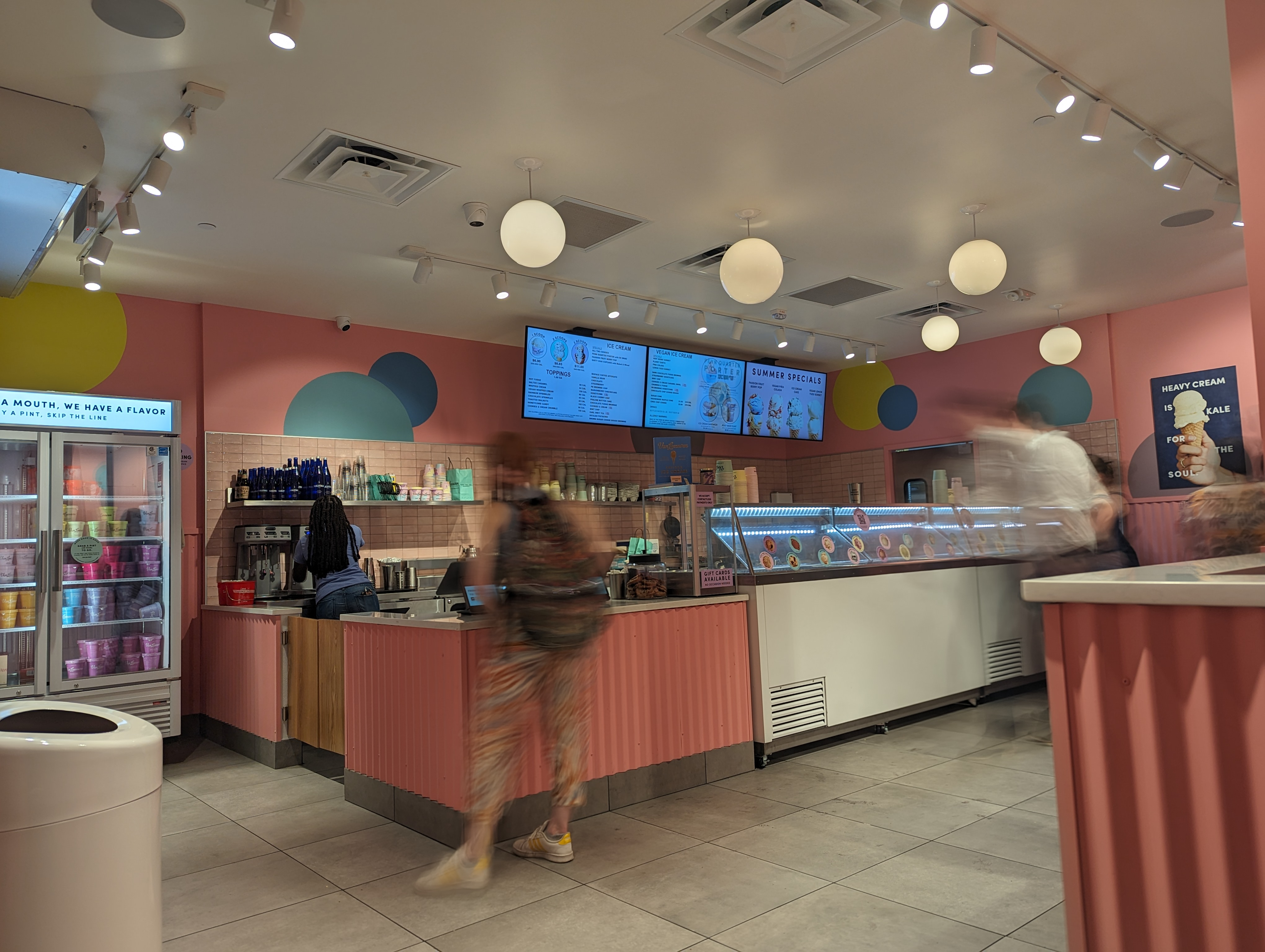
- Van Leeuwen branch in the Adams Morgan neighborhood of Washington, D.C.
- Founded: 2008 in New York City
- Founders: Pete Van Leeuwen; Ben Van Leeuwen; Laura O'Neill
- Website: vanleeuwenicecream.com

Van Leeuwen Ice Cream (/væn ˈluː.ən/) is an American ice cream parlor chain.

== History ==
Van Leeuwen began with a yellow food truck in New York City in 2008 operated by Pete Van Leeuwen, his brother Ben, and their Australian partner Laura O'Neill. The trio were seeking to make a “purer ice cream”. Their yellow trucks sold flavors based on imported ingredients like Ceylon cinnamon, Sicilian pistachios, and vanilla from Papua New Guinea. The American private equity firm Nextworld invested $18.7 million in the company in 2020. Van Leeuwen opened their 30th store in 2022 and has over 70 stores as of December 2024.

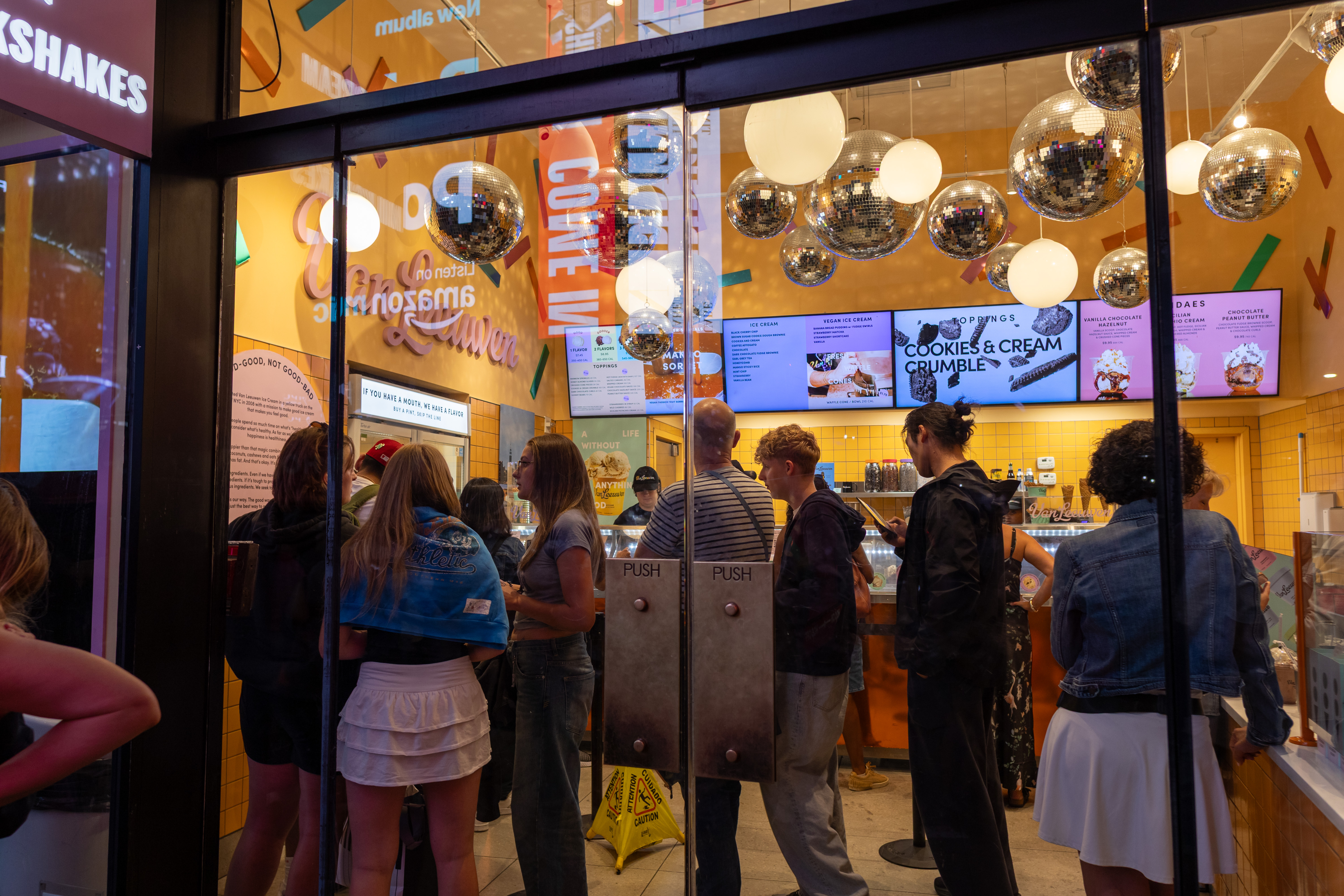
Van Leeuwen Ice Cream store in New York City, New York, United States.

In November 2022, Van Leeuwen entered a settlement agreement with the New York City Department of Consumer and Worker Protection. The chain agreed to comply with a New York City law that prohibited all-cashless operation and required retail acceptance of cash as payment, and to pay $33,000 in outstanding civil penalties. Van Leeuwen had been violating the law since it went into effect in November 2020 and did not appear for any administrative hearings.
