= Coffee production in Ecuador =

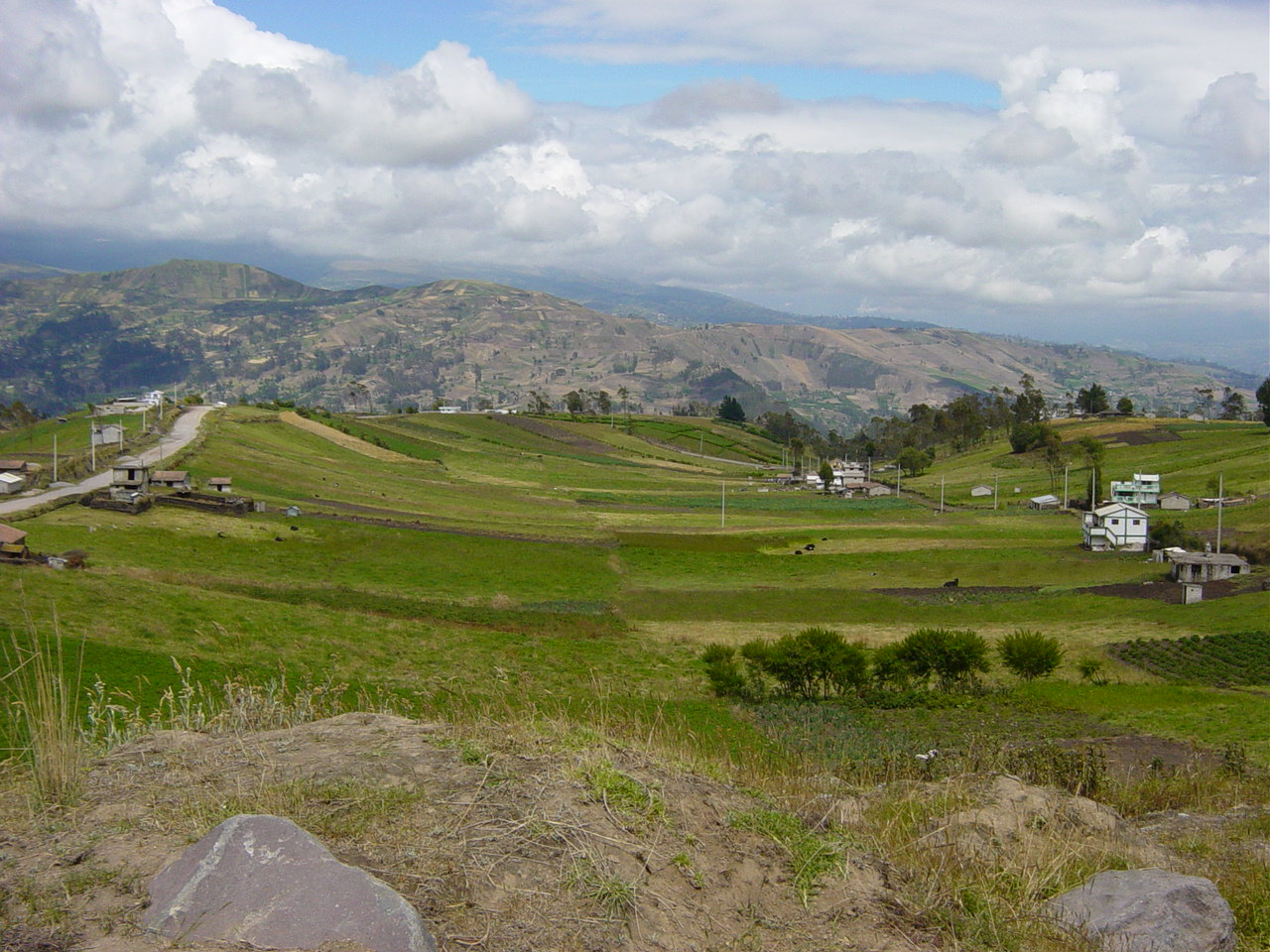
Landscape near Ambato, Ecuador

Coffee production in Ecuador is one of only 15 countries in the world that grows and exports both Arabica and Robusta coffee, the two main species of coffee produced and consumed in the world. Different ecosystems in Ecuador permit different coffee cultures to occur all over the country, including in the Galápagos Islands.

== History ==
=== First years ===
Historically, the Jipijapa Zone in the province of Manabí has been one of the most prominent places in which coffee has been cultivated in Ecuador. In 1860, coffee grains were introduced there. When Ecuador opened up to foreign trade and commerce, significant changes occurred throughout the country with new small plantations reaching a certain degree of development, allowing coffee export for the economic growth of the nation. This phenomenon occurred almost on par with cocoa production.

=== Growth ===
In 1903, the cultivation of coffee fell, but two years later, it began to grow again, with Ecuador commencing export to several European countries from the port of Manta. In 1935, the exports rose to 220,000 "sacos", 552,000 in 1960, nearly doubling to 1,018,000 in 1975, and 1,810,000 in 1985. However, due to economic recession in the 1990s, coffee export reduced slightly. In 2001, it had grown to 1,062,000 produced annually, equivalent to 63,720 metric tonnes. Of that tonnage, 311,804 was exported as grain. In 2001, the area under coffee cultivation in Ecuador was believed to be about 262,060 hectares, and by 2012 official government and industry figures put the figures at about 200,000 hectares, of which 150,000 hectares were rated as being in production. Ecuador's total annual coffee production is today (2012) estimated at 650,000 bags of 60 kilograms (the international standard used for measuring coffee production worldwide) of which between 60 and 70 percent is Arabica and the balance is made up by Robusta.

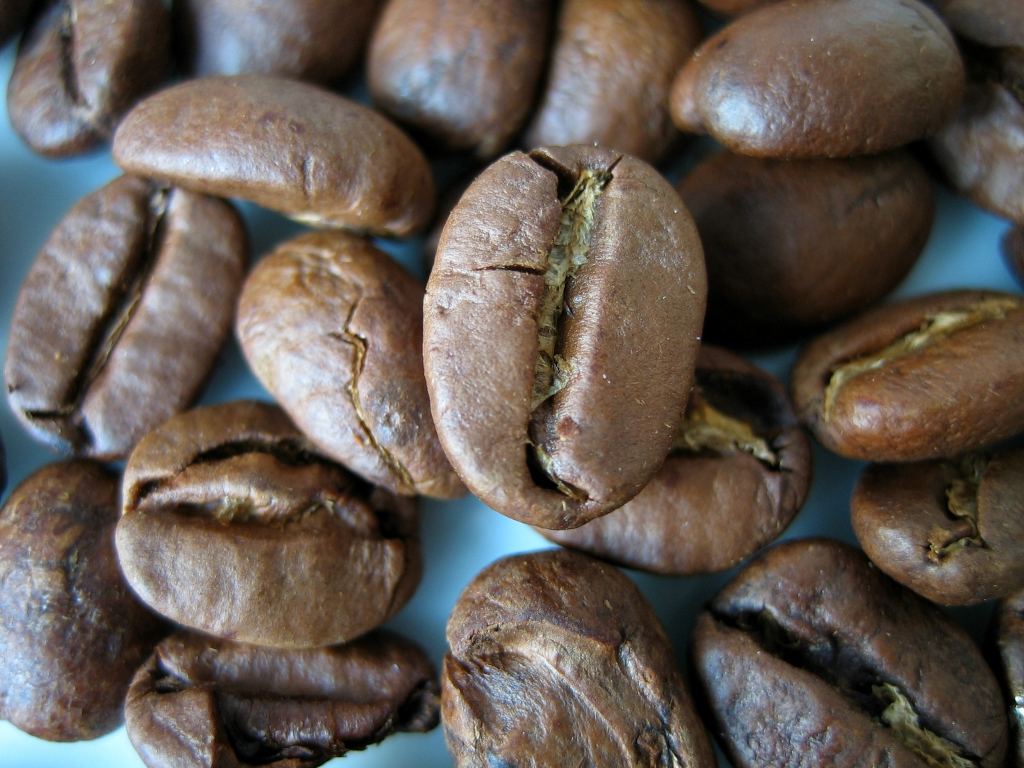
Grains of coffee

== Provinces of cultivation ==
The main provinces for coffee cultivation are as follows:

Variety of coffee	Provinces
Arábigo lavado	El Oro, Manabí, Loja, Guayas and Zamora Chinchipe
Arábigo natural	Loja, Manabí, El Oro, Los Ríos and Guayas
Robusta	Pichincha, Orellana, Sucumbíos, Guayas, Los Ríos and Napo

== Exports ==
The culture, production, commercialization, industrialization, and export of the coffee is one of the most important sectors of the economy of Ecuador, which is why it is necessary for private and the public sectors to work in conjunction with each other, in order to promote development and to achieve an improvement in the socio-economic conditions in the trade. CORPEI, COFENAC, and ANCAFE (Asociación Nacional de Exportadores de Café) are some institutions helping promote ecuadorian coffee around the world. Agriculturists dedicated to this activity, as well as the extension of exports, make important contributions to the Ecuadorian economy. As of June 2012, Ecuadorian coffee is exported to 29 countries worldwide, with Russia, Poland, Germany, Colombia, Italy, and the Netherlands accounting for over 80 percent of the total export volume.

== See also ==
- List of countries by coffee production
