= Jamal Murray =

Canadian basketball player (born 1997)

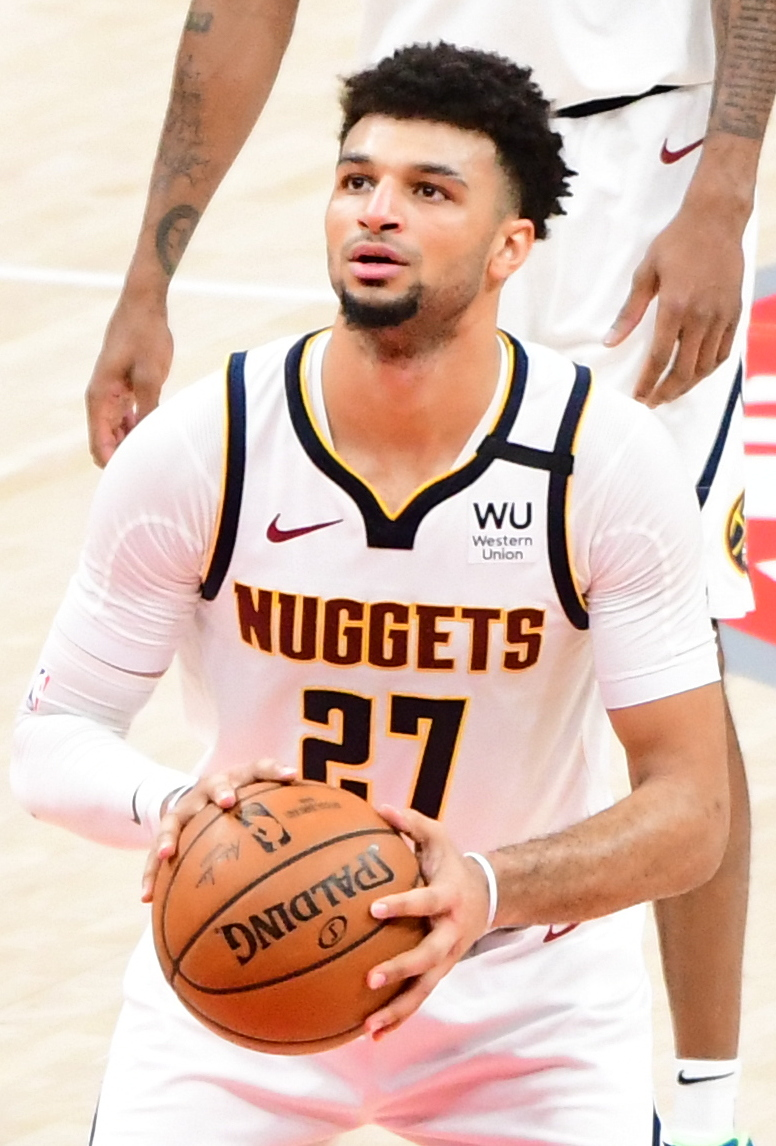
- Murray with the Denver Nuggets in 2020

No. 27 – Denver Nuggets
- Position: Point guard
- League: NBA

Personal information
- Born: February 23, 1997 (age 29) Kitchener, Ontario, Canada
- Listed height: 6 ft 4 in (1.93 m)
- Listed weight: 215 lb (98 kg)

Career information
- High school: Grand River (Kitchener, Ontario); Orangeville Prep (Mono, Ontario)
- College: Kentucky (2015–2016)
- NBA draft: 2016: 1st round, 7th overall pick
- Drafted by: Denver Nuggets
- Playing career: 2016–present

Career history
- 2016–present: Denver Nuggets

Career highlights
- NBA champion (2023); NBA All-Star (2026); All-NBA Third Team (2026); NBA All-Rookie Second Team (2017); Third-team All-American – AP (2016); First-team All-SEC (2016); SEC All-Freshman Team (2016); BioSteel All-Canadian MVP (2015)
- Stats at NBA.com
- Stats at Basketball Reference
Medals
Men's basketball
Representing Canada
Pan American Games
Silver medal – second place	2015 Toronto	National team
FIBA Americas U16 Championship
Bronze medal – third place	2013 Maldonado	National team

Jamal Murray (born February 23, 1997) is a Canadian professional basketball player for the Denver Nuggets of the National Basketball Association (NBA). He played one season of college basketball for the Kentucky Wildcats. Murray was selected by the Nuggets as the seventh overall pick in the 2016 NBA draft and was a key contributor to the team's first NBA championship run in 2023, becoming the ninth Canadian to win an NBA title. In 2026, Murray was named an NBA All-Star. He is also a member of the Canadian national team.

== Early life ==
Murray was born and raised in Kitchener, Ontario, the son of Sylvia (who is from Syria) and Roger Murray (who was born in Jamaica and moved to Canada at age nine). He also has one younger brother, Lamar. His father ran track and field and played basketball in his youth, notably competing against Lennox Lewis, a Kitchener resident, before Lewis began his professional boxing career.

When Murray was three years old, he could play basketball "for hours" and at age six played in a league for ten-year-olds. By the age of 12 or 13, he began playing pick-up games against top high school and college players. His father put him through many basketball drills and kung fu exercises, including meditation. Murray's father, a lifelong fan of Bruce Lee, employed Lee's teachings when he raised his son, and Murray has credited Lee for influencing the way he approaches basketball.

== High school career ==
Murray attended Grand River Collegiate Institute in Kitchener, later transferring to Orangeville Prep in Orangeville, Ontario, where his father served as an assistant coach. He and fellow prospect Thon Maker formed a duo that helped Orangeville Prep defeat many American schools.

At the 2013 Jordan Brand Classic International Game, Murray was named MVP, becoming the second Canadian to win the award after Duane Notice. At the 2015 Nike Hoop Summit, Murray scored a game-high 30 points and was named the MVP.

Murray was named MVP of the 2015 BioSteel All-Canadian Basketball Game, which includes the top high school players in Canada.

Murray played AAU basketball for the CIA Bounce.

== College career ==
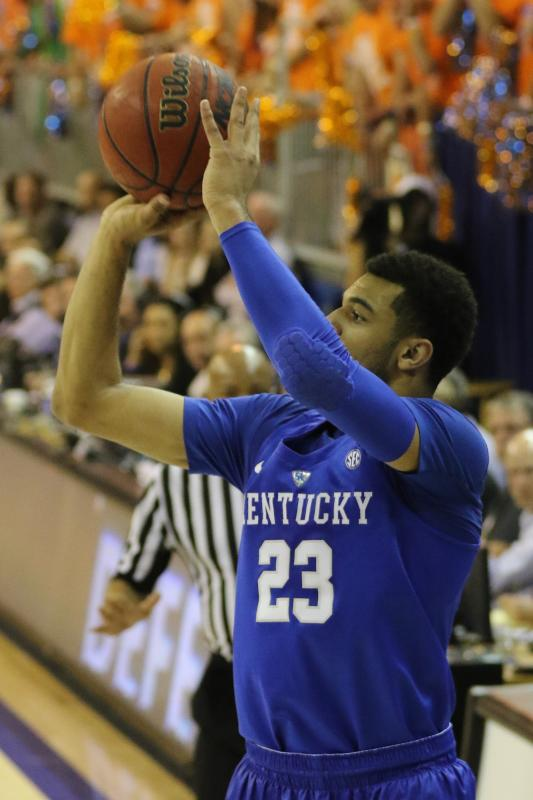
Murray with Kentucky in 2016

On June 24, 2015, Murray reclassified to the class of 2015 and committed to Kentucky to play for coach John Calipari. As a freshman in 2015–16, he was featured on the Midseason Top 25 list for the John R. Wooden Award, and was named to the 35-man midseason watchlist for the Naismith Trophy. He appeared in 36 games and averaged 20.0 points, 5.2 rebounds, and 2.2 assists while shooting 40.8% from three-point range. Following his freshman season, Murray was named a third-team All-American by the Associated Press. Murray also made the All-SEC First Team and the SEC All-Freshman Team. Murray's 20.0 points per game are the most by any freshman in Kentucky's program history and the most for any player in John Calipari's tenure as head coach.

He led the Wildcats, who had seven future NBA players on the roster, to a #1 ranking early in the season and the SEC title prior to being upset by 5-seed Indiana in the second round of March Madness. In April 2016, Murray declared for the NBA draft, forgoing his final three years of college eligibility.

== Professional career ==
=== Denver Nuggets (2016–present) ===
==== 2016–2019: Early years and first playoffs ====
On June 23, 2016, Murray was selected by the Denver Nuggets as the seventh overall pick in the 2016 NBA draft. On August 9, 2016, he signed his rookie scale contract with the Nuggets. On November 13, 2016, he scored a then career-high 19 points in a 112–105 loss to the Portland Trail Blazers. He topped that mark on November 22, scoring 24 points in a 110–107 win over the Chicago Bulls. On December 1, he was named Western Conference Rookie of the Month for games played in October and November. On February 17, 2017, Murray was named MVP of the Rising Stars Challenge after posting a game-high 36 points (9-14 3FG) and a game-high 11 assists in Team World's 150–139 victory over Team USA. On April 7, 2017, he scored a career-high 30 points in a 122–106 win over the New Orleans Pelicans. At the season's end, he was named to the NBA All-Rookie Second Team.

On November 11, 2017, Murray scored a career-high 32 points in a 125–107 win over the Orlando Magic. Six days later, he had a 31-point effort in a 146–114 win over the New Orleans Pelicans. On January 22, 2018, he scored a career-high 38 points, including a three-point play in the final minute, as the Nuggets beat the Portland Trail Blazers 104–101. On February 1, 2018, he had a 33-point effort in a 127–124 win over the Oklahoma City Thunder. His 90.5% free-throw percentage was fifth in the league and the 10th highest in team history.

On November 5, 2018, Murray scored a career-high 48 points in a 115–107 win over the Boston Celtics. On December 18, he had 22 points and a career-high 15 assists in a 126–118 win over the Dallas Mavericks. On December 29, he scored 46 points and made a career-high nine 3-pointers in a 122–118 win over the Phoenix Suns. On January 3, he scored 17 of his 36 points in the fourth quarter of the Nuggets' 117–113 win over the Sacramento Kings. On January 17, he scored 22 of his 25 points in the third quarter of the Nuggets' 135–105 win over the Bulls. On February 6, after missing six games with a sprained left ankle, Murray had 19 points and 11 assists in a 135–130 loss to the Brooklyn Nets. In Game 3 of the Nuggets' second-round playoff series against the Trail Blazers, Murray had a then playoff career-high 34 points in a 140–137 quadruple-overtime loss. In Game 4, he again scored 34 points in a 116–112 win.

==== 2019–2020: Western Conference Finals and NBA Bubble comebacks ====
On the first day of free agency period, Murray signed a contract extension of a 5-year, $170 million maximum deal with the Nuggets.

On November 17, 2019, Murray recorded a season-high 39 points and 8 assists, including seven three-pointers, in a 131–114 win over the Memphis Grizzlies. Three days later, during a 105–95 victory over the Houston Rockets, Murray recorded a career-high 6 steals, along with scoring 10 points and adding 9 assists. On December 23, Murray scored 28 points and would knock down a game-winning step-back jumper against the Phoenix Suns with 2.5 seconds remaining in overtime to secure a 113–111 road victory. On January 4, 2020, he tied his season-high 39 points in a 128–114 loss to the Washington Wizards. After missing ten games due to an ankle sprain suffered against Charlotte on January 15, Murray returned to have one of the best stretches of his career, averaging 31.3 points per game over a four-game stretch, including 36 points on 14-of-17 shooting and six three-pointers against the Suns on February 8. On March 4, Murray hit yet another game-winner, making an off-balance jumper with 4.5 seconds remaining in regulation to seal a 114–112 victory over the Hornets while capping off an 18-point, 6-assist performance.

On August 17, during the Nuggets' first round matchup with the Utah Jazz in the 2020 NBA playoffs, Murray recorded 36 points and 9 assists, scoring 20 points in the fourth quarter and overtime to lead the Nuggets to a 135–125 Game 1 victory. In Game 4 six days later, Murray erupted for a career-high 50 points, along with 11 rebounds and 7 assists, in a 129–127 loss to the Jazz. With Donovan Mitchell scoring 51, it was the first time in NBA playoff history that two opponents scored at least 50 points in the same game. In a potential elimination game in Game 5 with Denver down 3–1 in the series, Murray recorded 42 points, 8 rebounds, and 8 assists to lead the Nuggets to a 117–107 win and force a Game 6, where Murray again scored 50 points, shooting 9–12 from three and helping the Nuggets extend the series to a Game 7 with a 119–107 victory. Following Game 6, Murray became emotional during the postgame interview with TNT’s Jared Greenberg, addressing racial injustice, as well as honoring George Floyd and Breonna Taylor, as each of their pictures were on his shoes.

On September 15, in Game 7 against the Los Angeles Clippers, Murray scored 40 points while hitting six three-pointers, leading the Nuggets to a series-clinching 104–89 win to advance to the Western Conference Finals for the first time since 2009. With the win, the Nuggets became the first team in NBA history to comeback from multiple 3–1 deficits in a single postseason. However, the Nuggets would go on to lose in the Western Conference Finals in five games to the eventual NBA champion Los Angeles Lakers, with Murray recording 28 points, 8 rebounds, and 12 assists in the lone Denver victory in Game 3.

==== 2020–2022: ACL injury and year absence ====
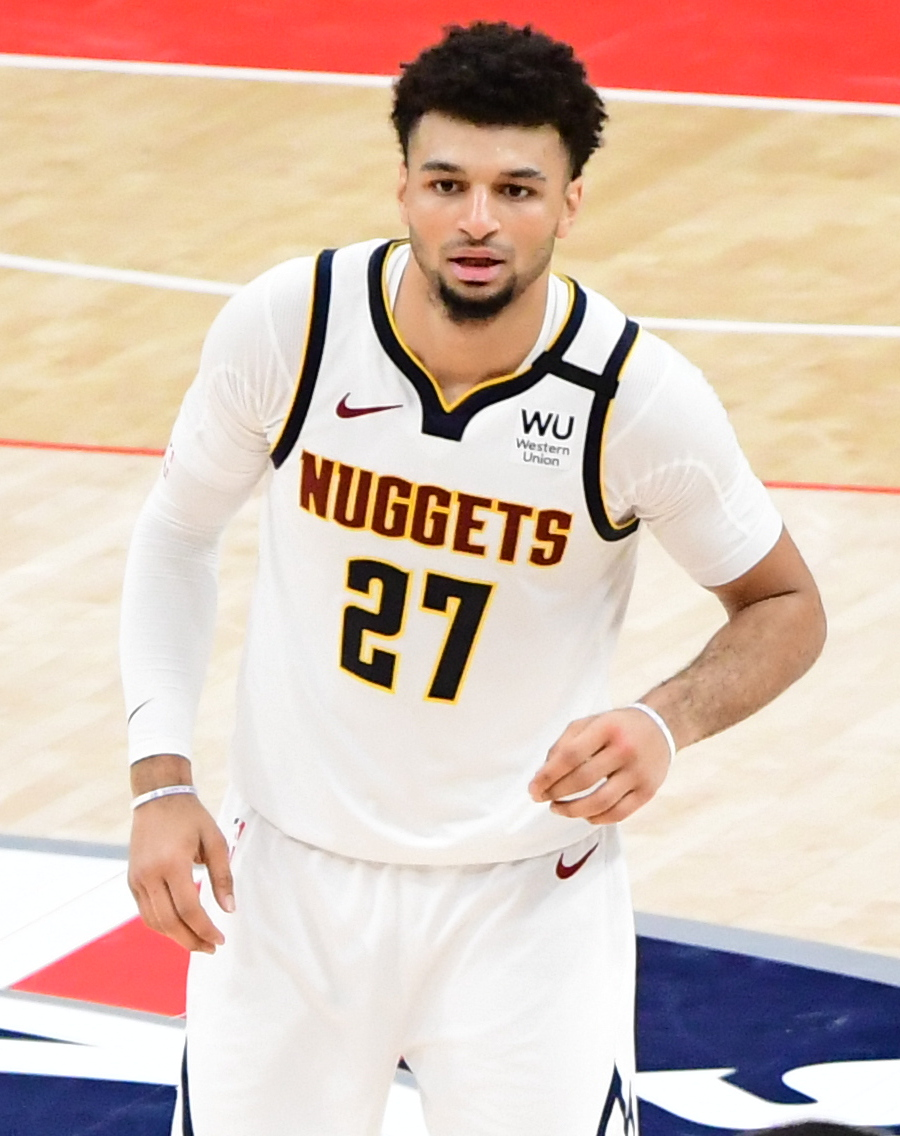
Murray in 2020

On February 19, 2021, Murray scored a then career–high 50 points in a 120–103 win over the Cleveland Cavaliers. During the game he became the first player in NBA history to score 50 points without attempting a free throw, as well as being the second player to get 50 points while shooting more than 80 percent from the field and from three-point range. On April 12, Murray suffered a torn ACL on his left knee during a game against the Golden State Warriors. The following day, the Nuggets announced Murray would be out indefinitely. On April 21, Murray underwent surgery on the torn ACL on his left knee. The same day Nuggets announced that he remained out indefinitely. Murray averaged a career-high 21.2 points, 4.8 assists, and 1.3 steals, and shot a career-high 47.7% FG and 40.8% 3FG while playing 35.5 minutes per game.

Although he was never officially shut down for the season, Murray missed the entire 2021–22 campaign while recovering from his ACL tear. Without Murray, the Nuggets lost in 5 games to the Golden State Warriors during the first round of the playoffs.

==== 2022–2023: Return from injury and first NBA championship ====
On October 19, 2022, Murray played in his first game in eighteen months, scoring 12 points in 26 minutes of playing time during a 123–102 loss to the Utah Jazz. On December 8, Murray scored 21 points including a game-winning three-pointer in a 121–120 win over the Portland Trail Blazers. On January 9, 2023, Murray scored a then-season-high 34 points in a 122–109 win over the Los Angeles Lakers. On February 4, Murray scored a season-high 41 points, along with five rebounds and seven assists in a 128–108 win over the Atlanta Hawks. On March 10, in a game against the San Antonio Spurs, Murray made his 805th career three-pointer and surpassed Will Barton to become the all-time leader in three-pointers made in Nuggets history. His 172 three-pointers was fifth in franchise history, but second that season behind teammate Michael Porter Jr.'s 188.

In Game 2 of the Nuggets' first round playoff series against the Minnesota Timberwolves, Murray scored 40 points in a 122–113 win. This was his fifth 40-point postseason game, passing Alex English for the franchise record. In Game 1 of the Western Conference Semifinals, Murray recorded 34 points, 5 rebounds and 9 assists in a 125–107 win over the Phoenix Suns. In Game 2 of the Western Conference Finals, Murray scored 23 of his 37 points in the fourth quarter, along with 10 rebounds, 5 assists and 4 steals, propelling the Nuggets to a 108–103 come-from-behind win over the Los Angeles Lakers for a 2–0 lead in the series. In Game 3 of the Western Conference Finals, Murray scored 30 of his 37 points in the first half, along with seven rebounds and six assists in a 119–108 win, helping the Nuggets take a commanding 3–0 series lead. Murray was again an integral part of the Nuggets during Game 4, during which he scored 25 points en route to a 113–111 victory. With the win, the Nuggets completed a 4-game sweep of the Lakers and advanced to their first-ever NBA Finals appearance. He also became the first player in NBA history to average 30 points on 50/40/90 shooting in the Conference Finals.

In Game 1 of the NBA Finals, Murray put up 26 points and 10 assists in a 104–93 win over the Miami Heat. He and Nikola Jokić also became only the second pair of teammates in NBA history to each put up at least 25 points and 10 assists in an NBA Finals game since Magic Johnson and James Worthy in the 1987 NBA Finals. In Game 3, Murray posted a 30-point triple-double with 34 points, 10 rebounds, and 10 assists in a 109–94 win over the Heat. He and Jokić became the first teammates in NBA history (regular season or playoffs) to record 30-point triple-doubles in the same game. In Game 4, Murray put up 15 points and 12 assists in a 108–95 win over the Heat. He also became the first player in NBA history to put up at least 10 assists in each of his first four Finals games. In Game 5, Murray put up 14 points, eight rebounds, and eight assists in a 94–89 win over the Heat to help lead the Nuggets to their first NBA championship in franchise history. He also averaged 21.4 points, 6.2 rebounds, and 10.0 assists per game in the Finals, joining Magic Johnson, Michael Jordan, and LeBron James as the only players in NBA history to average at least 20 points and 10 assists per game in an NBA Finals series.

==== 2023–2025: Coming up short ====
On April 22, 2024, in Game 2 of the first round of the playoffs against the Los Angeles Lakers, Murray put up 20 points along with a buzzer-beating, game-winning fadeaway jump shot over Anthony Davis in a 101–99 victory, completing the Nuggets' 20-point comeback and giving the Nuggets a 2–0 series lead. A week later, Murray suffered a strained calf in a Game 4 loss. Despite this, he scored 32 points, including a 14-foot game-winning shot with 1.5 seconds left in a 108–106 Game 5 victory, thus sending the Denver Nuggets past the Lakers to the Western Conference Semifinals. He also became the first player to score two go-ahead shots in the final five seconds in the same postseason series.

On May 6, 2024, during Game 2 of the Conference Semifinals against the Minnesota Timberwolves, Murray threw a heat pack and towel towards the court while he was on the bench. He was fined $100,000 the next day by the NBA but was not suspended. The Nuggets lost the series in seven games, despite a 35-point performance from Murray in a 98–90 closeout loss in a decisive Game 7.

On September 7, 2024, Murray signed a four-year, $208 million contract extension with the Nuggets. On January 14, 2025, Murray scored a then season-high 45 points (32 points in the first half) in a 118–99 win over the Dallas Mavericks. On February 12, Murray scored a season-high and career-high 55 points in a 132–121 win over the Portland Trail Blazers. Murray's 55 points was also a record for most points in an NBA game by a Canadian player, breaking Shai Gilgeous-Alexander's previous record of 54 points. On April 29, in game 5 of the Nuggets' first round playoff series against the Los Angeles Clippers, Murray had 43 points on 17/26 shooting from the field, making 8/14 3-point attempts in a 131–115 win to go up 3–2 in the series. This performance marked the 6th time Murray had scored 40+ points in a playoff game, the most in franchise history at that time. Denver would go on to beat the Clippers in seven games, but then lost to the Oklahoma City Thunder in a hard-fought conference semifinal series, also in seven games.

==== 2025–present: First All-Star and All-NBA appearances ====
On December 3, 2025, Murray put up 52 points, including 10 three-pointers made in a 135–120 win over the Indiana Pacers. He joined Aaron Gordon as the only players to put up at least 50 points on at least 10 three-pointers made in a game in Nuggets franchise history. On December 8, Murray was named the NBA’s Western Conference Player of the Week for Week 7 (December 1 – December 7), for the first time in his career, after averaging 29.8 points, 4.5 rebounds, and 7.5 assists during a 3–1 week for the Nuggets.

On January 4, 2026, Murray recorded 27 points, six rebounds, and a then career-high 16 assists in a 127–115 loss to the Brooklyn Nets. On January 7, Murray followed up his previous game by notching 22 points, eight rebounds, and a career-best 17 assists in an 114–110 win over the Boston Celtics. On February 1, Murray was named to his first All-Star Game as a Western Conference reserve. On March 25, Murray scored a season-high 53 points, shooting 19-of-28 from the field, including 9-of-14 from three-point range, in a 142–135 win over the Dallas Mavericks. He joined Nikola Jokić and Kiki Vandeweghe as the only Nuggets players to score 50 or more points multiple times in a season. On March 27 against the Utah Jazz, Murray broke the franchise single-season three point shots record, surpassing Michael Porter Jr., shooting a high volume at a high percentage. Murray finished the regular season with career highs of 25.4 points, 4.4 rebounds, and 7.1 assists per game, while also setting personal bests in shooting at 48.3% from the field and 43.5% from three-point range. He was named to the All-NBA Third Team, his first career All-NBA selection. He and Nikola Jokić became just the second pair of Nuggets teammates to receive All-NBA honors in the same season, joining Carmelo Anthony and Chauncey Billups in 2008–09.

On April 18, in Game 1 of the first round playoffs series, Murray recorded 30 points, five rebounds, and seven assists in a 116–105 win over the Minnesota Timberwolves. He and Nikola Jokić had their eighth playoff game with both posting 25+ points, 5+ rebounds, and 5+ assists, tying Michael Jordan and Scottie Pippen for the most instances by a duo in NBA playoff history.

On October 24, 2026, Murray scored 42 points in a 141–135 overtime victory against the New Orleans Pelicans, making eight three-pointers. This marked his eighth career game with at least eight three-pointers made, surpassing J. R. Smith for the most such games in Nuggets franchise history.

== Career statistics ==
Legend
GP	Games played	GS	Games started	MPG	Minutes per game
FG%	Field goal percentage	3P%	3-point field goal percentage	FT%	Free throw percentage
RPG	Rebounds per game	APG	Assists per game	SPG	Steals per game
BPG	Blocks per game	PPG	Points per game	**Bold**	Career high
†	Won an NBA championship	*	Led the league

=== NBA ===
==== Regular season ====
Year	Team	GP	GS	MPG	FG%	3P%	FT%	RPG	APG	SPG	BPG	PPG
2016–17	Denver	**82***	9	21.5	.404	.334	.883	2.6	2.1	.6	.3	9.9
2017–18	Denver	81	**80**	31.7	.451	.378	**.905**	3.7	3.4	1.0	.3	16.7
2018–19	Denver	75	74	32.6	.437	.367	.848	4.2	4.8	.9	.4	18.2
2019–20	Denver	59	59	32.3	.456	.346	.881	4.0	4.8	1.1	.3	18.5
2020–21	Denver	48	48	35.5	.477	.408	.869	4.0	4.8	1.3	.3	21.2
2022–23^{†}	Denver	65	65	32.8	.453	.398	.832	4.0	6.2	1.0	.2	20.0
2023–24	Denver	59	59	31.5	.481	.425	.853	4.1	6.5	1.0	**.7**	21.2
2024–25	Denver	67	67	**36.1**	.474	.393	.886	3.9	6.0	**1.4**	.5	21.4
2025–26	Denver	75	75	35.4	**.483**	**.435**	.887	**4.4**	**7.1**	.9	.4	**25.4**
Career		611	536	31.8	.459	.390	.874	3.8	5.0	1.0	.4	18.9
All-Star		1	0	18.4	.231	.500	–	4.0	8.0	1.0	.0	8.0

==== Playoffs ====
Year	Team	GP	GS	MPG	FG%	3P%	FT%	RPG	APG	SPG	BPG	PPG
2019	Denver	14	14	36.3	.425	.337	.903	4.4	4.7	1.0	.1	21.3
2020	Denver	19	19	39.6	**.505**	**.453**	.897	4.8	6.6	.9	.3	**26.5**
2023^{†}	Denver	**20**	**20**	39.9	.473	.396	.926	**5.7**	**7.1**	**1.5**	.3	26.1
2024	Denver	12	12	38.5	.402	.315	.923	4.3	5.6	.8	.5	20.6
2025	Denver	14	14	**41.3**	.444	.354	.875	4.9	5.2	1.2	**.8**	21.8
2026	Denver	6	6	39.7	.357	.262	**.975**	5.0	5.7	.8	.3	23.7
Career		85	85	39.3	.449	.374	.913	4.9	6.0	1.1	.4	23.7

=== College ===
Year	Team	GP	GS	MPG	FG%	3P%	FT%	RPG	APG	SPG	BPG	PPG
2015–16	Kentucky	36	36	35.2	.454	.408	.783	5.2	2.2	1.0	.3	20.0

== National team career ==
Murray represented Canada at the 2013 FIBA Americas Under-16 Championship in Uruguay, and averaged 17 points, 6 rebounds and 2.4 steals per game in leading the team to a bronze medal. He played for the Canadian national team at the 2015 Pan American Games, helping the team win a silver medal. His final averages for the tournament were 16.0 points, 3.2 rebounds, and 2.4 assists per game, while shooting 45.9% from the field.

On May 24, 2022, Murray agreed to a three-year commitment to play with the Canadian senior men's national team. He joined Canada in their preparations for the 2023 FIBA Basketball World Cup, but eventually decided to miss the competition to recover from his championship-winning NBA season.

He was named to Canada's roster for the 2024 Summer Olympics in Paris.

== Awards and honors ==
NBA

- NBA champion: 2023
- NBA All-Star: 2026
- All-NBA Third Team: 2026
- NBA All-Rookie Second Team: 2017
- Rising Stars Challenge MVP: 2017
- Western Conference Rookie of the Month: October/November 2016

College

- Third-team All-American – AP (2016)
- First-team All-SEC (2016)
- SEC All-Freshman Team (2016)
- SEC All-Tournament Team (2016)

== Personal life ==
Murray is in a relationship with former University of Kentucky schoolmate Harper Hempel. While at Orangeville Prep, Murray along with other athletes lived for two years at the nearby Rosebud Motel, which is also noteworthy as a filming location for high-profile film and television productions such as Schitt's Creek and A History of Violence. Murray is the father of a daughter born in 2023.

== See also ==
- List of NBA career free throw percentage leaders
- List of NBA single-game playoff scoring leaders
