= Grand River Collegiate Institute =

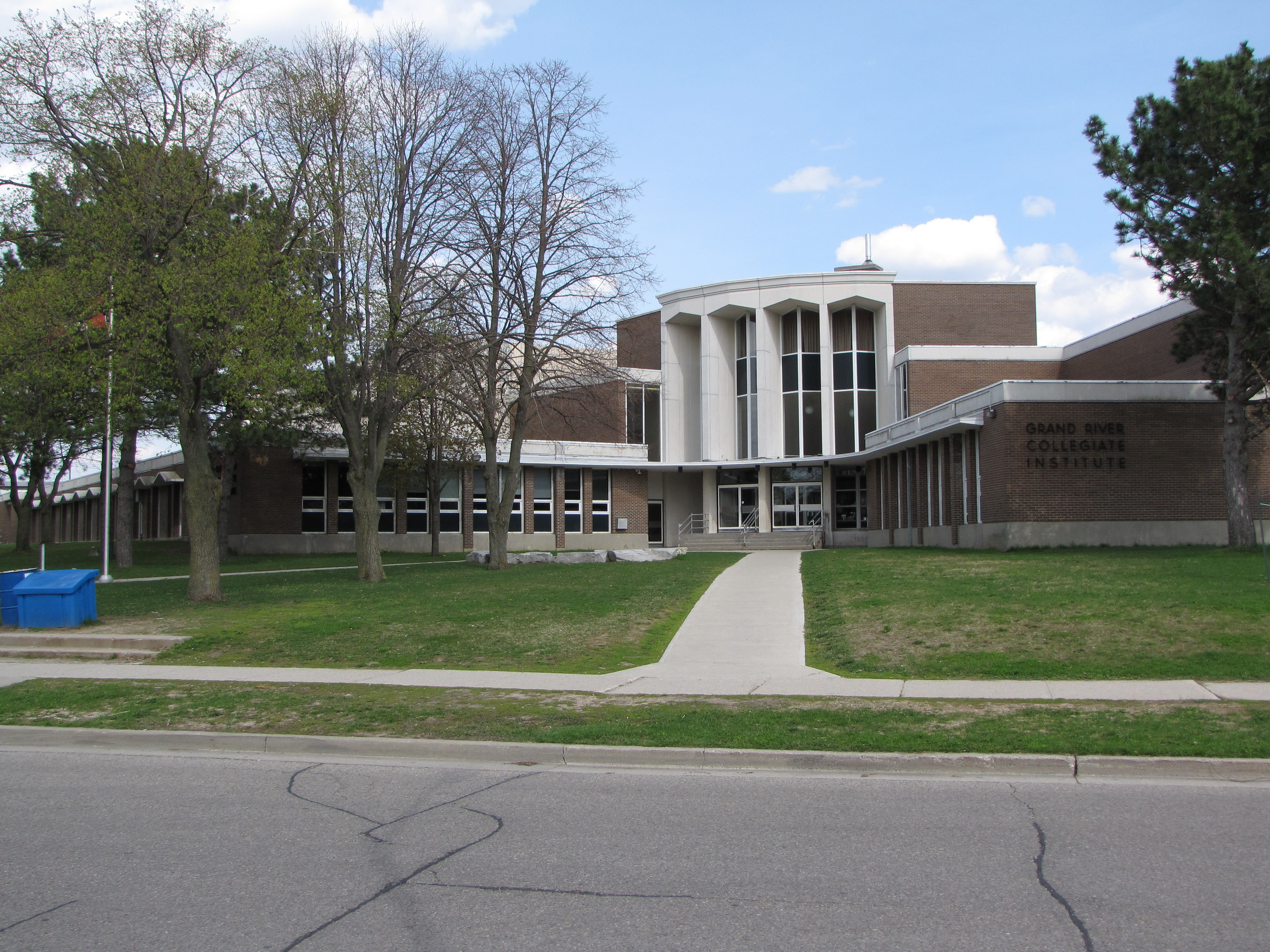

Location
- 175 Indian Road; Kitchener, Ontario, N2B 2S7; Canada; 43.4574°N 80.4372°W

Information
- School type: High School
- Founded: 1966
- School board: Waterloo Region District School Board
- Superintendent: Bobbie Chatha
- Principal: Debra Derman
- Vice-Principals: Sara Hansen, Craig McLeman, Dollie Butticci
- Grades: 9-12
- Enrollment: 1485 (December 2023)
- Language: English and French (Extended)
- Area: Stanley Park
- Colours: Gold, Blue, and White
- Mascot: A Warrior
- Team name: Renegades
- Website: grc.wrdsb.ca

Grand River Collegiate Institute is a public secondary school in Kitchener, Ontario. The school is located at 175 Indian Road. It is part of the Waterloo Region District School Board. As of November 2023, there are approximately 1450 full-time students and 130 staff.

== History ==
As the fifth collegiate in Kitchener-Waterloo, Grand River Collegiate (GRCI) was built on Indian Road near the Grand River in Kitchener's eastern area. "Grand River" was chosen in favour of other names like 'Parkwood' or 'Sand Hills', as the name for the new school. GRCI officially opened on September 6, 1966, with about 850 students and 55 teachers.

Grand River Collegiate Institute has had seven principals:

- Ross L. Shaver (1966 to 1984)
- Gary A. Boug (1984 to 1995)
- Ray Teed (1996 to Jan 2008)
- Agnes Dufournaud (Feb 2008 to Aug 2009)
- Scott Lomax (Aug 2009 to Jan 2011)
- Deborah Tyrrell (Feb 2011 to June 2017)
- Jim Woolley (July 2017 to Oct. 2018)
- Josh Windsor (Oct. 2018 - June 2024)
- Jennifer Shortreed (June 2024 – June 2026)
- Debra Derman (June 2026 – Present)

== Athletics ==
Grand River has athletic groups which include: alpine skiing, badminton, basketball, cross-country, curling, field hockey, football, golf, ice hockey, Nordic skiing, rugby, soccer, tennis, track & field and volleyball, and wrestling. Grand River's sports teams are known as the Renegades (commonly shortened to the "Rens").

== Notable alumni ==
- Cole Schwindt NHL hockey player, Vegas Knights
- Chelsea Aubry, Olympic Basketball player
- Riley Damiani NHL hockey player, Dallas Stars
- Dana Ellis, Olympic Pole Vaulter
- Jill Hennessy, actress
- Mike Hoffman, NHL Hockey player, Ottawa Senators
- Jamal Murray, Basketball player, Kentucky Wildcats, Denver Nuggets
- Mark Scheifele, NHL Hockey player, Winnipeg Jets
- Kelly VanderBeek, Olympic Alpine Skier
- Jenny Heijun Wills, author
- Will Riley, Basketball Player, Illinois Fighting Illini, Utah Jazz
- Donovan Sebrango, NHL Hockey Player, Florida Panthers

== See also ==
- Education in Ontario
- List of secondary schools in Ontario
