= Kentavious Caldwell-Pope =

American basketball player (born 1993)

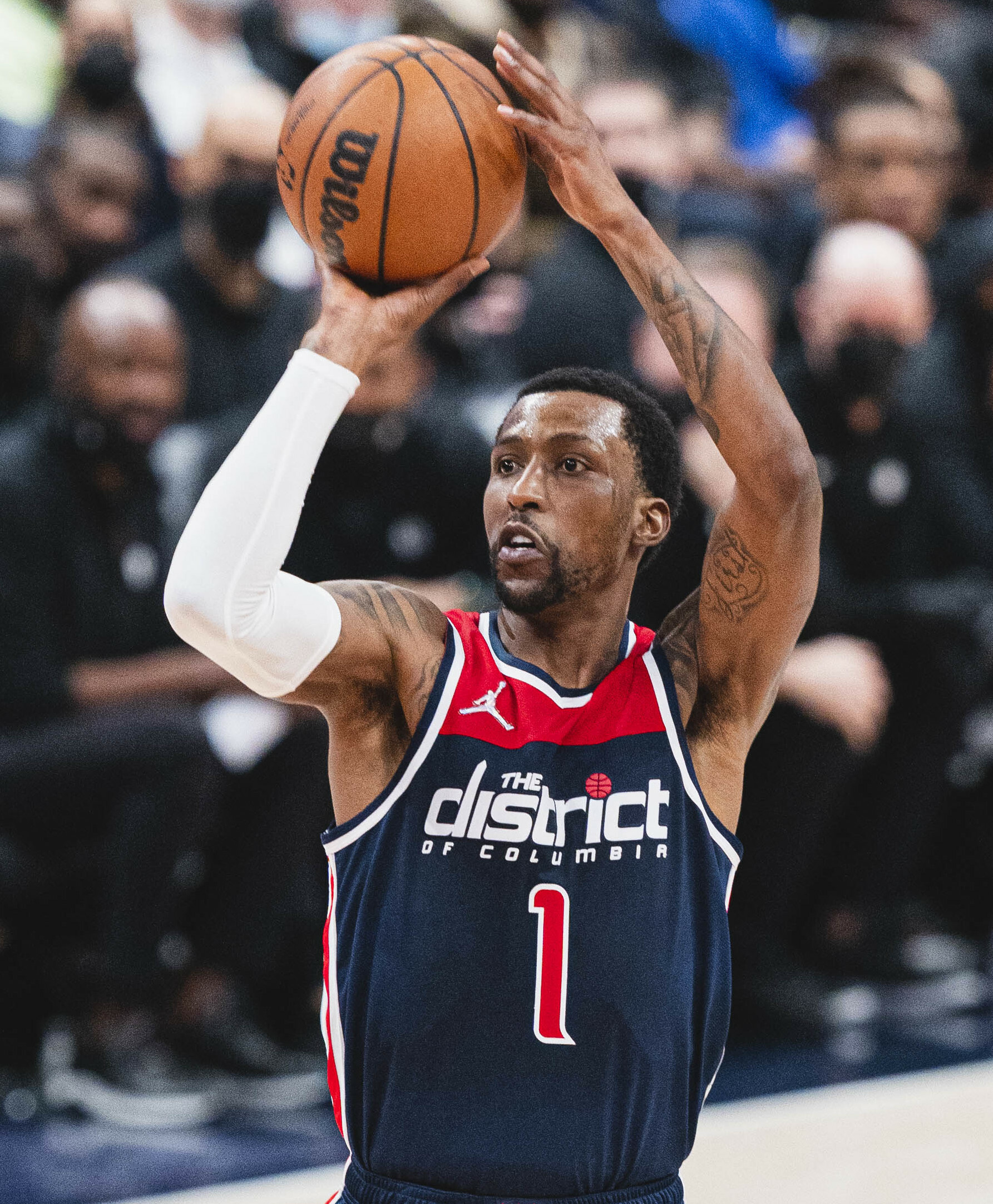
- Caldwell-Pope with the Washington Wizards in 2022

No. 1 – Philadelphia 76ers
- Position: Shooting guard
- League: NBA

Personal information
- Born: February 18, 1993 (age 33) Thomaston, Georgia, U.S.
- Listed height: 6 ft 5 in (1.96 m)
- Listed weight: 204 lb (93 kg)

Career information
- High school: Greenville (Greenville, Georgia)
- College: Georgia (2011–2013)
- NBA draft: 2013: 1st round, 8th overall pick
- Drafted by: Detroit Pistons
- Playing career: 2013–present

Career history
- 2013–2017: Detroit Pistons
- 2017–2021: Los Angeles Lakers
- 2021–2022: Washington Wizards
- 2022–2024: Denver Nuggets
- 2024–2025: Orlando Magic
- 2025–2026: Memphis Grizzlies
- 2026–present: Philadelphia 76ers

Career highlights
- 2× NBA champion (2020, 2023); SEC Player of the Year (2013); First-team All-SEC (2013); SEC All-Freshman Team (2012); McDonald's All-American (2011)
- Stats at NBA.com
- Stats at Basketball Reference

Kentavious Tannell Caldwell-Pope (/kɛnˈteɪviəs/ ken-TAY-vee-əs; né Caldwell; born February 18, 1993), also known by his initials KCP, is an American professional basketball player for the Philadelphia 76ers of the National Basketball Association (NBA). He was named a McDonald's All-American as one of the top high school basketball players in the class of 2011. He played college basketball for two years with the Georgia Bulldogs in the Southeastern Conference (SEC), and was voted the SEC Player of the Year as a sophomore in 2013.

Caldwell-Pope was selected with the eighth overall pick in the 2013 NBA draft by the Detroit Pistons. He played four seasons with the Pistons before joining the Los Angeles Lakers as a free agent in 2017–18. He won his first NBA championship with the Lakers in 2020. He spent a season with the Washington Wizards after having been traded there from the Lakers in August 2021, and was subsequently traded to the Denver Nuggets in July 2022, winning his second NBA championship in 2023. He has also played for the Orlando Magic.

== Early life ==
Caldwell-Pope was born as Kentavious Caldwell to Rhonda Caldwell and Lawrence Pope. He decided to add his father's surname to his own when he was a junior in high school.

== High school career ==
Caldwell-Pope was a highly heralded player in high school. As a senior, he averaged 31 points and 8.2 rebounds per game at Greenville High School in Greenville, Georgia. He led the Patriots to the State Class A Final Four in 2011 and to consecutive Sweet 16 berths in 2009–10.

He was named to several prominent high school All-America teams as a senior, including being selected to play in the 2011 McDonald's All-American Game and the Jordan Brand Classic.

As a senior, he was rated the nation's No. 3 shooting guard prospect, the No. 12 prospect overall, by recruiting analysts for Rivals.com.

Caldwell-Pope chose Georgia to play for Mark Fox and Cody Anderson over scholarship offers from Alabama, Florida State, Georgia Tech, and Tennessee, among others.

College recruiting
Name	Hometown	School	Height	Weight	Commit date
Kentavious Caldwell-Pope; G	Greenville, Georgia	Greenville	6 ft 5 in (1.96 m)	185 lb (84 kg)	Jul 17, 2010
Kentavious Caldwell-Pope; G	Recruit ratings: Scout: Rivals: (97)				
Overall recruit ranking:
Note: In many cases, Scout, Rivals, 247Sports, On3, and ESPN may conflict in their listings of height and weight.; In these cases, the average was taken. ESPN grades are on a 100-point scale.; Sources:

== College career ==
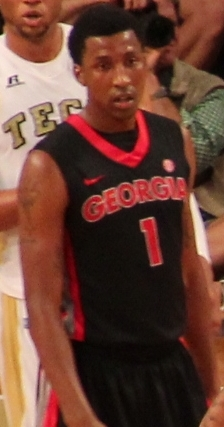
Caldwell-Pope playing for Georgia in 2012

As a freshman at Georgia, Caldwell-Pope was named to the Coaches' Freshman All-SEC Team, which also included NBA lottery picks Bradley Beal, Anthony Davis, and Michael Kidd-Gilchrist. His highest output as a freshman was 25 points against Ole Miss, which was the most by a UGA freshman in almost 13 years.

As a sophomore, Caldwell-Pope was named SEC Player of the Year after averaging 18.5 points and 7.1 rebounds per game. In his final collegiate game, he scored a career-high 32 points and 13 rebounds in a loss against LSU at the SEC tournament in Nashville. He declared for the NBA draft after the season.

== Professional career ==
=== Detroit Pistons (2013–2017) ===
On June 27, 2013, Caldwell-Pope was selected with the eighth overall pick in the 2013 NBA draft by the Detroit Pistons. He later joined the Pistons for the 2013 NBA Summer League and signed his rookie scale contract with the team on July 19. On April 16, 2014, he scored a then-career-high 30 points in a loss to the Oklahoma City Thunder.

In July 2014, Caldwell-Pope rejoined the Pistons for the 2014 NBA Summer League, where he averaged 24 points and 7.4 rebounds in five games. Head coach Stan Van Gundy quickly assessed Caldwell-Pope as his best perimeter defender and he wound up leading the Pistons in minutes played with 2,587. Caldwell-Pope got better after the All-Star break, largely thanks to the acquisition of point guard Reggie Jackson; post All-Star Break, Caldwell-Pope averaged 14.3 points per game. He finished the season with 153 three-point shots made, 70 more than the closest Pistons player. He tied Kevin Love for 16th in the NBA.

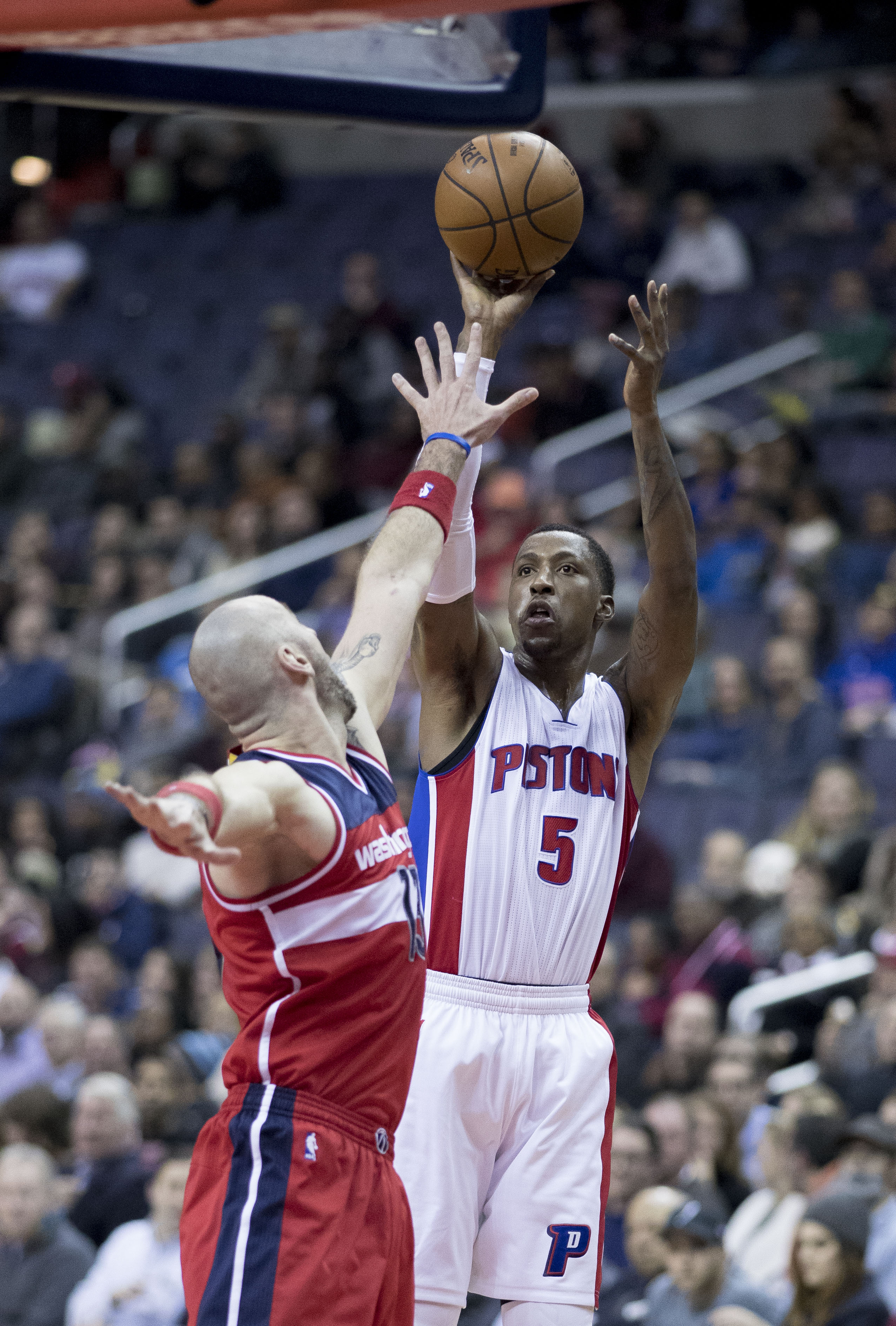
Caldwell-Pope with the Pistons in December 2016, shooting over Marcin Gortat of the Washington Wizards

On December 16, 2015, Caldwell-Pope scored a then career-high 31 points in a 119–116 win over the Boston Celtics. He helped the Pistons finish the 2015–16 regular season with a 44–38 record, which was good for the eighth seed in the Eastern Conference. The Pistons thus qualified for the playoffs for the first time since 2009. In the first round of the playoffs, the Pistons faced the first-seeded Cleveland Cavaliers, and in a Game 1 loss on April 17, Caldwell-Pope scored a team-high 21 points. The Pistons went on to lose the series 4–0.

On November 9, 2016, Caldwell-Pope scored a then season-high 27 points in a 107–100 loss to the Phoenix Suns. On November 25, 2016, he recorded 16 points and a career-high 10 assists in a 108–97 win over the Los Angeles Clippers. On January 8, 2017, he hit a three-pointer with 9.4 seconds left in double overtime to lead the Pistons to a 125–124 win over the Portland Trail Blazers; he finished with 26 points. On February 1, 2017, he scored a career-high 38 points in a 118–98 win over the New Orleans Pelicans. He also made a career-high eight three-pointers on 11 attempts. On February 23, 2017, Caldwell-Pope scored 33 points, including three three-pointers late in the fourth quarter during a Detroit rally, as the Pistons defeated the Charlotte Hornets 114–108 in overtime. Caldwell-Pope's three-pointer with 18.2 seconds to play tied the game at 100.

On June 23, 2017, Caldwell-Pope was suspended for two games without pay by the NBA for pleading guilty to operating a motor vehicle while intoxicated.

On July 7, 2017, the Pistons renounced the rights to Caldwell-Pope, making him an unrestricted free agent.

=== Los Angeles Lakers (2017–2021) ===
On July 13, 2017, Caldwell-Pope signed a one-year, $18 million contract with the Los Angeles Lakers. He made his debut for the Lakers on October 22, 2017, scoring 20 points as a starter in a 119–112 loss to the New Orleans Pelicans. On November 27, 2017, he scored a season-high 29 points against the Los Angeles Clippers. On December 13, 2017, Caldwell-Pope pleaded guilty to a probation violation he committed during the summer. He was handed a 25-day jail sentence, but under a work-release program, was allowed to leave the facility for home games and practices. He was not allowed to leave California, limiting him to only home games within the state during that period. On February 24, 2018, he scored a season-high 34 points and hit a career-high-tying eight 3-pointers in a 113–108 win over the Sacramento Kings. On March 22, 2018, he hit eight 3-pointers and had 28 points in a 128–125 loss to the New Orleans Pelicans.

On July 6, 2018, Caldwell-Pope re-signed with the Lakers, on a reported one-year, $12 million contract. On December 16, 2018, he scored a season-high 25 points in a 128–110 loss to the Washington Wizards. On December 30, he set a new season high with 26 points in a 121–114 win over the Kings. On March 19, he had a season-high 35 points in a 115–101 loss to the Milwaukee Bucks.

In 2019, Caldwell-Pope re-signed with the Lakers once again, this time on a two-year contract worth roughly $16 million. In 2019–20, he made a career-high 38.5% of his 3-pointers and was third on the team with 92 made 3-pointers. Caldwell-Pope won his first NBA championship when the Lakers defeated the Miami Heat in six games in the 2020 NBA Finals. He was instrumental in the victory, especially in game 4 when his five straight points late in the fourth quarter helped the Lakers pull away from the Heat and sealed the win in that game. He started all 21 games in the playoffs, averaging 10.7 points in 29 minutes per game and making 37.8% of his 3-pointers.

Caldwell-Pope declined his player option on the second year of his contract and became a free agent. On November 23, 2020, he re-signed with the Lakers on a three-year, $40 million deal.

=== Washington Wizards (2021–2022) ===
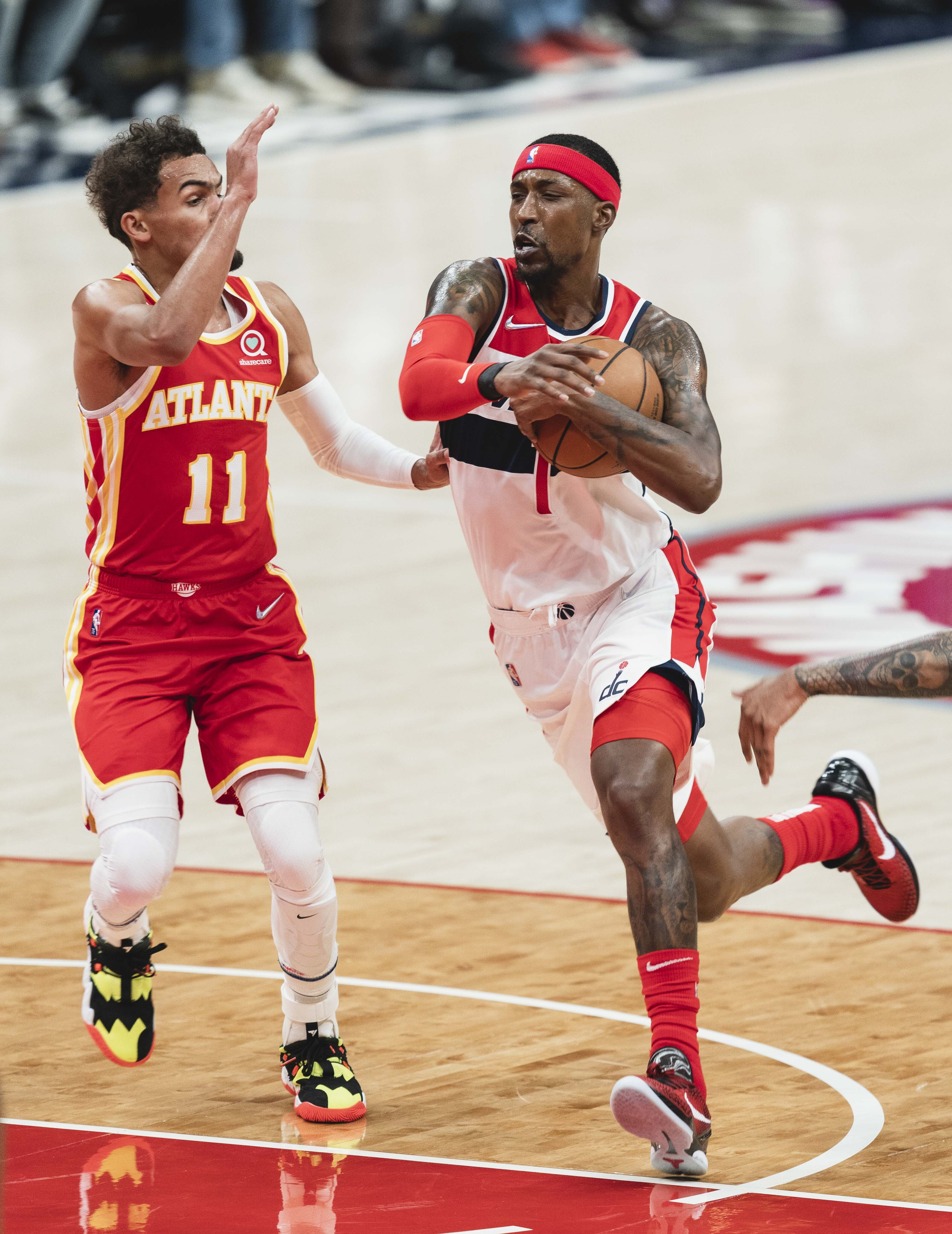
Caldwell-Pope of the Washington Wizards drives past Trae Young of the Atlanta Hawks in 2021

On August 6, 2021, Caldwell-Pope was traded to the Washington Wizards as part of a package for Russell Westbrook. In 77 games with the team, he averaged 13.2 points, 3.4 rebounds, and 1.9 assists per game.

=== Denver Nuggets (2022–2024) ===
On July 6, 2022, Caldwell-Pope was traded, alongside Ish Smith, to the Denver Nuggets in exchange for Monté Morris and Will Barton. On July 16, Caldwell-Pope signed a two-year, $30 million contract extension with the Nuggets. He made his Nuggets debut on October 19, recording two points, four rebounds, six assists and two steals in a 123–102 loss to the Utah Jazz. In Game 5 of the NBA Finals, Caldwell-Pope put up 11 points, four rebounds, two assists, two steals, three blocks and grabbed the series-clinching rebound before dribbling out the final seconds on the clock in a 94–89 win over the Miami Heat to help the Nuggets win their first NBA championship in franchise history, awarding Caldwell-Pope his second ring.

=== Orlando Magic (2024–2025) ===
On July 6, 2024, Caldwell-Pope signed a three-year, $66 million contract with the Orlando Magic. Caldwell-Pope started all 77 games he appeared in during the 2024–25 NBA season, averaging 8.7 points, 2.2 rebounds, and 1.8 assists.

=== Memphis Grizzlies (2025–2026) ===
On June 15, 2025, Caldwell-Pope was traded to the Memphis Grizzlies, alongside Cole Anthony, four unprotected first-round picks including the 16th overall pick in the 2025 NBA draft, and a 2029 first-round pick swap in exchange for Desmond Bane. He made 51 appearances (including 14 starts) for the Grizzlies during the 2025–26 NBA season, averaging 8.4 points, 2.5 rebounds, and 2.7 assists. On February 19, 2026, it was announced that Caldwell-Pope would require season-ending surgery to address "misalignment of his right pinky finger." After the season, he reached a buyout agreement with the Grizzlies.

=== Philadelphia 76ers (2026–present) ===
On August 5, 2026, Caldwell-Pope signed a one-year, $3.9 million contract with the Philadelphia 76ers.

On October 20, 2026, Caldwell-Pope made his 76ers debut, recording 10 points and four rebounds in a 106–100 win over the New York Knicks.

== Career statistics ==
Legend
GP	Games played	GS	Games started	MPG	Minutes per game
FG%	Field goal percentage	3P%	3-point field goal percentage	FT%	Free throw percentage
RPG	Rebounds per game	APG	Assists per game	SPG	Steals per game
BPG	Blocks per game	PPG	Points per game	**Bold**	Career high
†	Won an NBA championship	*	Led the league

=== NBA ===
==== Regular season ====
Year	Team	GP	GS	MPG	FG%	3P%	FT%	RPG	APG	SPG	BPG	PPG
2013–14	Detroit	80	41	19.8	.396	.319	.770	2.0	.7	.9	.2	5.9
2014–15	Detroit	**82**	**82***	31.5	.401	.345	.696	3.1	1.3	1.1	.2	12.7
2015–16	Detroit	76	76	**36.7**	.420	.309	.811	3.7	1.8	1.4	.2	**14.5**
2016–17	Detroit	76	75	33.3	.399	.350	.832	3.3	2.5	1.2	.2	13.8
2017–18	L.A. Lakers	74	74	33.2	.426	.383	.789	**5.2**	2.2	1.4	.2	13.4
2018–19	L.A. Lakers	**82***	23	24.8	.430	.347	.867	2.9	1.3	.9	.2	11.4
2019–20^{†}	L.A. Lakers	69	26	25.5	**.467**	.385	.775	2.1	1.6	.8	.2	9.3
2020–21	L.A. Lakers	67	67	28.4	.431	.410	.866	2.7	1.9	.9	.4	9.7
2021–22	Washington	77	77	30.2	.435	.390	.890	3.4	1.9	1.1	.3	13.2
2022–23^{†}	Denver	76	76	31.3	.462	**.423**	.824	2.7	2.4	**1.5**	.5	10.8
2023–24	Denver	76	76	31.6	.460	.406	.894	2.4	2.4	1.3	**.6**	10.1
2024–25	Orlando	77	77	29.6	.439	.342	.863	2.2	1.8	1.3	.4	8.7
2025–26	Memphis	51	14	21.3	.410	.316	**.913**	2.5	**2.7**	.8	.2	8.4
Career		963	784	29.2	.427	.365	.826	2.9	1.9	1.1	.3	11.0

==== Playoffs ====
Year	Team	GP	GS	MPG	FG%	3P%	FT%	RPG	APG	SPG	BPG	PPG
2016	Detroit	4	4	**40.3**	.440	**.444**	.714	**4.3**	**2.8**	**1.8**	.3	**15.3**
2020^{†}	L.A. Lakers	**21**	**21**	29.1	.418	.378	.815	2.1	1.3	1.0	.2	10.7
2021	L.A. Lakers	5	5	29.2	.379	.211	**1.000**	2.8	1.0	1.0	.0	6.2
2023^{†}	Denver	20	20	33.5	**.457**	.380	.829	3.3	1.6	1.3	**.7**	10.6
2024	Denver	12	12	35.0	.395	.327	**1.000**	2.9	2.6	1.4	.4	8.1
2025	Orlando	5	5	32.6	.267	.261	.750	3.0	1.8	1.4	.6	5.0
Career		67	67	32.4	.418	.358	.843	2.8	1.7	1.2	.4	9.7

=== College ===
Year	Team	GP	GS	MPG	FG%	3P%	FT%	RPG	APG	SPG	BPG	PPG
2011–12	Georgia	**32**	**32**	32.1	.396	.304	.654	5.2	1.2	1.8	.3	13.2
2012–13	Georgia	**32**	**32**	**33.9**	**.433**	**.373**	**.799**	**7.1**	**1.8**	**2.0**	**.5**	**18.5**
Career		64	64	33.0	.415	.339	.727	6.2	1.5	1.9	.4	15.9

== Personal life ==
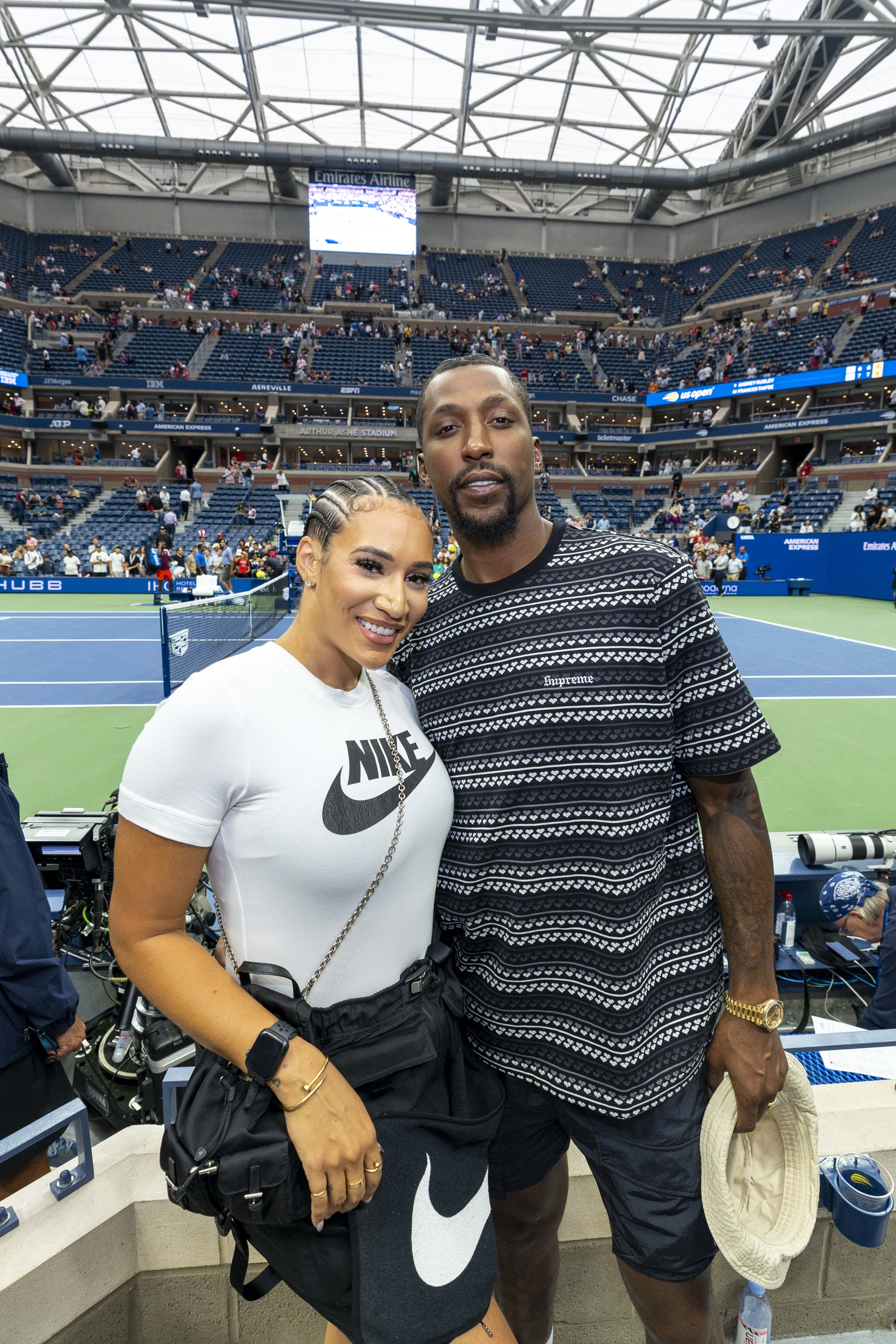
Caldwell-Pope and his wife, McKenzie, at the 2022 US Open

Caldwell-Pope married partner McKenzie Redmon in June 2016. They have three sons and one daughter.

== See also ==
- List of NBA career 3-point scoring leaders
