= 2023 NBA Finals =

North America basketball championship

| Team | Coach | Wins |
|---|---|---|
| Denver Nuggets | Michael Malone | 4 |
| Miami Heat | Erik Spoelstra | 1 |
- Dates: June 1–12
- MVP: Nikola Jokić (Denver Nuggets)
- Eastern finals: Heat defeated Celtics, 4–3
- Western finals: Nuggets defeated Lakers, 4–0

The 2023 NBA Finals was the championship series of the National Basketball Association's (NBA) 2022–23 season and conclusion to the season's playoffs. In the best-of-seven playoff series, the Western Conference champion Denver Nuggets defeated the Eastern Conference champion Miami Heat in five games, winning their first championship in franchise history after 47 seasons in the NBA. They became the second former American Basketball Association (ABA) team to win an NBA title, joining the San Antonio Spurs. Denver's Nikola Jokić was unanimously voted the NBA Finals Most Valuable Player (MVP), after averaging 30.2 points, 14.0 rebounds, 7.2 assists, and 1.4 blocks while shooting 58.3% from the field and 42.1% from the 3-point line.

The series started on June 1, and concluded on June 12. It was the first NBA Finals appearance for Denver. The Heat were the second No. 8 seed to reach the Finals, along with the New York Knicks in the 1999 NBA Finals.

== Background ==
=== Miami Heat ===
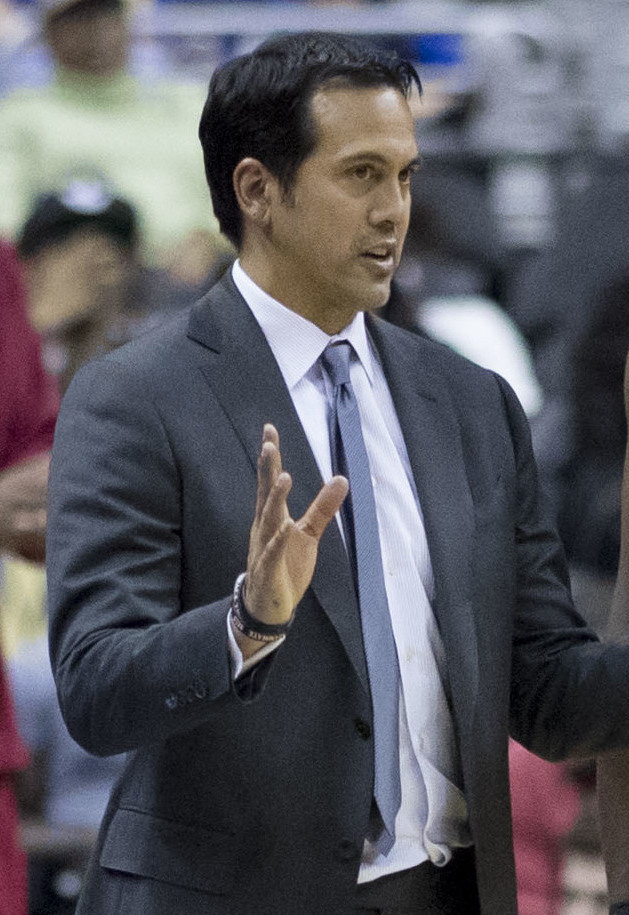
Head coach Erik Spoelstra led the eighth-seeded Heat to their sixth NBA Finals under his tenure.

After losing in Game 7 of the Eastern Conference finals as the top seed in the Eastern Conference the previous season, the Heat barely qualified for the playoffs in 2023. They regressed from their 53–29 record the previous season and finished with a record of 44–38, their worst since the 2018–19 season when they missed the playoffs. Additionally, they finished the regular season ranked dead last in points per game and were the only team in the league to qualify for the playoffs with a negative point differential. Although they finished 7th in the regular season standings, Miami had to go through two play-in games to extend their season, losing to the Atlanta Hawks in the first and defeating the Chicago Bulls in the second, earning the 8th seed in the NBA playoffs.

In the first round, they faced the Milwaukee Bucks, the team with the best record in the league and the betting favorites to win the championship. The Heat took game 1 on the road after Bucks star Giannis Antetokounmpo suffered a lower back contusion in the first half that ruled him out for the remainder of game 1, as well as the next two games. The Heat also lost star power of their own, as they lost starter Tyler Herro in game 1 with a broken hand, and Victor Oladipo with a torn left patellar tendon in game 3. Despite their setbacks, the Heat still managed to take a 2–1 series lead. In game 4, the Heat trailed by 12 with under six minutes remaining, but they went on a pivotal 30–13 run down the stretch, with Jimmy Butler scoring a career-high 56 points in a 119–114 victory to put the Bucks on the brink of elimination. The Heat then overcame a 16-point fourth-quarter deficit in game 5 to become the sixth 8-seeded team to defeat a 1-seeded team in playoff history. Butler, who averaged just 22.9 points in the regular season, finished the first round averaging 37.6 points on 60% from the field.

Later in the conference semifinals, they defeated the New York Knicks in six games to clinch their third conference finals appearance in the last four seasons, where they faced the Boston Celtics, who finished with the second-best record in the league. The Heat led the series 3–0 before the Celtics won the next three games to force a game 7, in hopes of becoming the first NBA team to overcome a 3–0 series deficit. Miami won game 7 on the road by a score of 103–84, earning their seventh overall NBA Finals appearance. Butler was named the Eastern Conference finals MVP, while Caleb Martin, who averaged just 9.6 points in the regular season, finished the conference finals averaging 19.3 points. The Heat became the first eight-seeded team since the 1999 New York Knicks to reach the NBA Finals, and the first eighth-seeded team to reach the Finals in a full 82-game regular season. Outside of Butler and Bam Adebayo, the Heat got a majority of their playoff production from undrafted players such as Martin, Gabe Vincent, Duncan Robinson, and Max Strus, as well as veterans Kyle Lowry, Cody Zeller, and Kevin Love, the latter of whom Miami acquired in February 2023 after he was bought out by the Cleveland Cavaliers.

=== Denver Nuggets ===
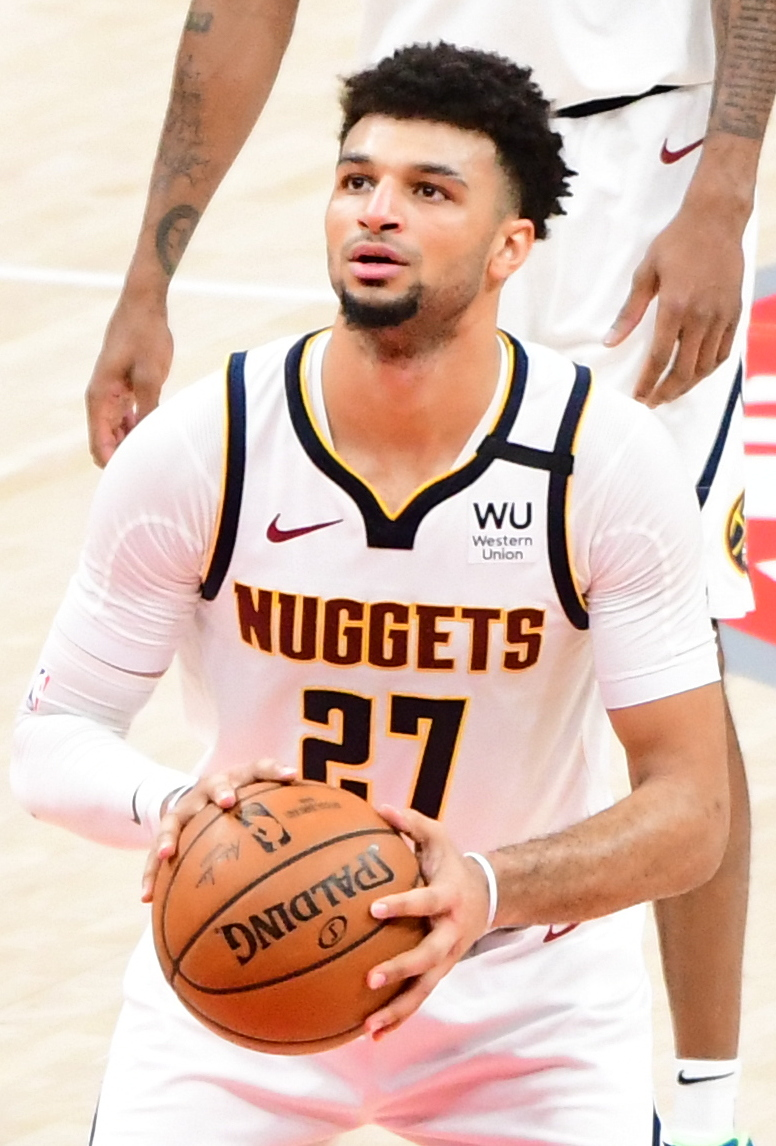
Jamal Murray returned to the playoffs after a two-year absence caused by injury.

The Nuggets have had several years of recent success. In 2020, they reached their first Western Conference finals appearance since 2009; however, they fell to the Los Angeles Lakers, who went on to win the 2020 NBA Finals. Denver could not get over the hump after this, largely due to injuries to key players. Jamal Murray, who was crucial to the Nuggets' playoff runs in 2019 and 2020, tore his ACL a month before the start of the 2021 playoffs as the Nuggets were swept by the Phoenix Suns in the second round. The 2021–22 season proved to be challenging as well, as the Nuggets had to play without Murray and lost starting forward Michael Porter Jr. to season-ending back surgery nine games into the season. Despite this, Denver still finished the season with a 48–34 record and earned the sixth seed, led by back-to-back MVP Nikola Jokić and starting power forward Aaron Gordon, who the Nuggets acquired in the middle of the 2020–21 season from the Orlando Magic for Gary Harris, R. J. Hampton, and a 2025 first-round pick. In the first round of the playoffs, the Nuggets lost in five games to the Golden State Warriors, who went on to win the 2022 NBA Finals.

The Nuggets entered the 2022–23 season with Murray and Porter Jr. healthy again. During the offseason, they traded for starting guard Kentavious Caldwell-Pope and rotation player Ish Smith from the Washington Wizards in exchange for Monté Morris and Will Barton. Denver also signed Bruce Brown in free agency and added young talent through the 2022 NBA draft, selecting Christian Braun and trading for Peyton Watson, giving up draft picks and JaMychal Green. With a healthy roster, the Nuggets finished the season with a 53–29 record and clinched the top seed in the Western Conference for the first time in franchise history.

In the first round of the playoffs, the Nuggets won in five games over the eighth-seeded Minnesota Timberwolves. Denver then faced the fourth-seeded Phoenix Suns, who previously swept them in the conference semifinals in 2021. After going up 2–0 in the series, Phoenix won both their home games to tie the series at 2–2, despite a career-high 53 points from Jokić in game 4. The Nuggets then won game 5 in Denver and beat Phoenix on the road to advance in six games. Denver reached their second conference finals in four years, where they faced the seventh-seeded Los Angeles Lakers, who previously defeated them in their first seven postseason matchups. The Nuggets defeated the Lakers in four games, marking their first sweep of an opponent in franchise history en route to reaching the Finals for the first time in their history. Jokić was awarded Western Conference finals MVP, as he surpassed Wilt Chamberlain for the most triple-doubles in a single postseason. Playing in their 47th season in the NBA, the Nuggets became the last of the four teams from the American Basketball Association (ABA) that merged with the NBA to reach the NBA Finals. The franchise appeared in the championship round once in the ABA in 1975–76, the league's final season before the merger.

=== Road to the Finals ===
Eastern Conference
| # | Team | W | L | PCT | GB | GP |
|---|---|---|---|---|---|---|
| 1 | z – Milwaukee Bucks * | 58 | 24 | .707 | – | 82 |
| 2 | y – Boston Celtics * | 57 | 25 | .695 | 1.0 | 82 |
| 3 | x – Philadelphia 76ers | 54 | 28 | .659 | 4.0 | 82 |
| 4 | x – Cleveland Cavaliers | 51 | 31 | .622 | 7.0 | 82 |
| 5 | x – New York Knicks | 47 | 35 | .573 | 11.0 | 82 |
| 6 | x – Brooklyn Nets | 45 | 37 | .549 | 13.0 | 82 |
| 7 | y – Miami Heat * | 44 | 38 | .537 | 14.0 | 82 |
| 8 | x – Atlanta Hawks | 41 | 41 | .500 | 17.0 | 82 |
| 9 | pi – Toronto Raptors | 41 | 41 | .500 | 17.0 | 82 |
| 10 | pi – Chicago Bulls | 40 | 42 | .488 | 18.0 | 82 |
| 11 | Indiana Pacers | 35 | 47 | .427 | 23.0 | 82 |
| 12 | Washington Wizards | 35 | 47 | .427 | 23.0 | 82 |
| 13 | Orlando Magic | 34 | 48 | .415 | 24.0 | 82 |
| 14 | Charlotte Hornets | 27 | 55 | .329 | 31.0 | 82 |
| 15 | Detroit Pistons | 17 | 65 | .207 | 41.0 | 82 |

Western Conference
| # | Team | W | L | PCT | GB | GP |
|---|---|---|---|---|---|---|
| 1 | c – Denver Nuggets * | 53 | 29 | .646 | – | 82 |
| 2 | y – Memphis Grizzlies * | 51 | 31 | .622 | 2.0 | 82 |
| 3 | y – Sacramento Kings * | 48 | 34 | .585 | 5.0 | 82 |
| 4 | x – Phoenix Suns | 45 | 37 | .549 | 8.0 | 82 |
| 5 | x – Los Angeles Clippers | 44 | 38 | .537 | 9.0 | 82 |
| 6 | x – Golden State Warriors | 44 | 38 | .537 | 9.0 | 82 |
| 7 | x – Los Angeles Lakers | 43 | 39 | .524 | 10.0 | 82 |
| 8 | x – Minnesota Timberwolves | 42 | 40 | .512 | 11.0 | 82 |
| 9 | pi – New Orleans Pelicans | 42 | 40 | .512 | 11.0 | 82 |
| 10 | pi – Oklahoma City Thunder | 40 | 42 | .488 | 13.0 | 82 |
| 11 | Dallas Mavericks | 38 | 44 | .463 | 15.0 | 82 |
| 12 | Utah Jazz | 37 | 45 | .451 | 16.0 | 82 |
| 13 | Portland Trail Blazers | 33 | 49 | .402 | 20.0 | 82 |
| 14 | Houston Rockets | 22 | 60 | .268 | 31.0 | 82 |
| 15 | San Antonio Spurs | 22 | 60 | .268 | 31.0 | 82 |

Notes

- z – Clinched home court advantage for the entire playoffs
- c – Clinched home court advantage for the conference playoffs
- y – Clinched division title
- x – Clinched playoff spot
- pi – Clinched play-in tournament spot
- * – Division leader

Play-in results
| Miami Heat (Eastern Conference champion) | | Denver Nuggets (Western Conference champion) |
|---|---|---|
| Lost to the 8th placed Atlanta Hawks, 105–116 | Game 1 | N/A |
| Defeated the 10th placed Chicago Bulls, 102–91 | Game 2 | N/A |

Playoff results
| Miami Heat (Eastern Conference champion) | | Denver Nuggets (Western Conference champion) |
|---|---|---|
| Defeated the 1st-seeded Milwaukee Bucks, 4–1 | First round | Defeated the 8th-seeded Minnesota Timberwolves, 4–1 |
| Defeated the 5th-seeded New York Knicks, 4–2 | Conference semifinals | Defeated the 4th-seeded Phoenix Suns, 4–2 |
| Defeated the 2nd-seeded Boston Celtics, 4–3 | Conference finals | Defeated the 7th-seeded Los Angeles Lakers, 4–0 |

=== Regular season series ===
The Nuggets won the regular season series 2–0.

December 30, 2022

Recap

Miami Heat 119, Denver Nuggets 124

Ball Arena, Denver, Colorado

February 13, 2023

Recap

Denver Nuggets 112, Miami Heat 108

Miami-Dade Arena, Miami, Florida

== Series summary ==
On April 26, the NBA announced that the start times for all the weeknight Finals games will move from 9:00 p.m. to 8:30 p.m. EDT for the first time in 20 years. Sunday start times remained at 8:00 p.m. EDT.

| Game | Date | Road team | Result | Home Team |
|---|---|---|---|---|
| Game 1 | June 1 | Miami Heat | 93–104 (0–1) | Denver Nuggets |
| Game 2 | June 4 | Miami Heat | 111–108 (1–1) | Denver Nuggets |
| Game 3 | June 7 | Denver Nuggets | 109–94 (2–1) | Miami Heat |
| Game 4 | June 9 | Denver Nuggets | 108–95 (3–1) | Miami Heat |
| Game 5 | June 12 | Miami Heat | 89–94 (1–4) | Denver Nuggets |

== Game summaries ==
Note: Times are EDT (UTC−4) as listed by the NBA. For games in Denver, the local time is also given (MDT, UTC−6).

=== Game 1 ===
ABC

June 1
8:30 pm (6:30 pm MDT)

Recap

Miami Heat 93, Denver Nuggets 104
Scoring by quarter: 20–29, 22–30, 21–25, 30–20
| Pts: Bam Adebayo 26; Rebs: Bam Adebayo 13; Asts: Jimmy Butler 7 | Pts: Nikola Jokić 27; Rebs: Michael Porter Jr. 13; Asts: Nikola Jokić 14 |
Denver leads series, 1–0

Ball Arena, Denver, Colorado
Attendance: 19,528
Referees:
- No. 8 Marc Davis
- No. 16 David Guthrie
- No. 14 Ed Malloy

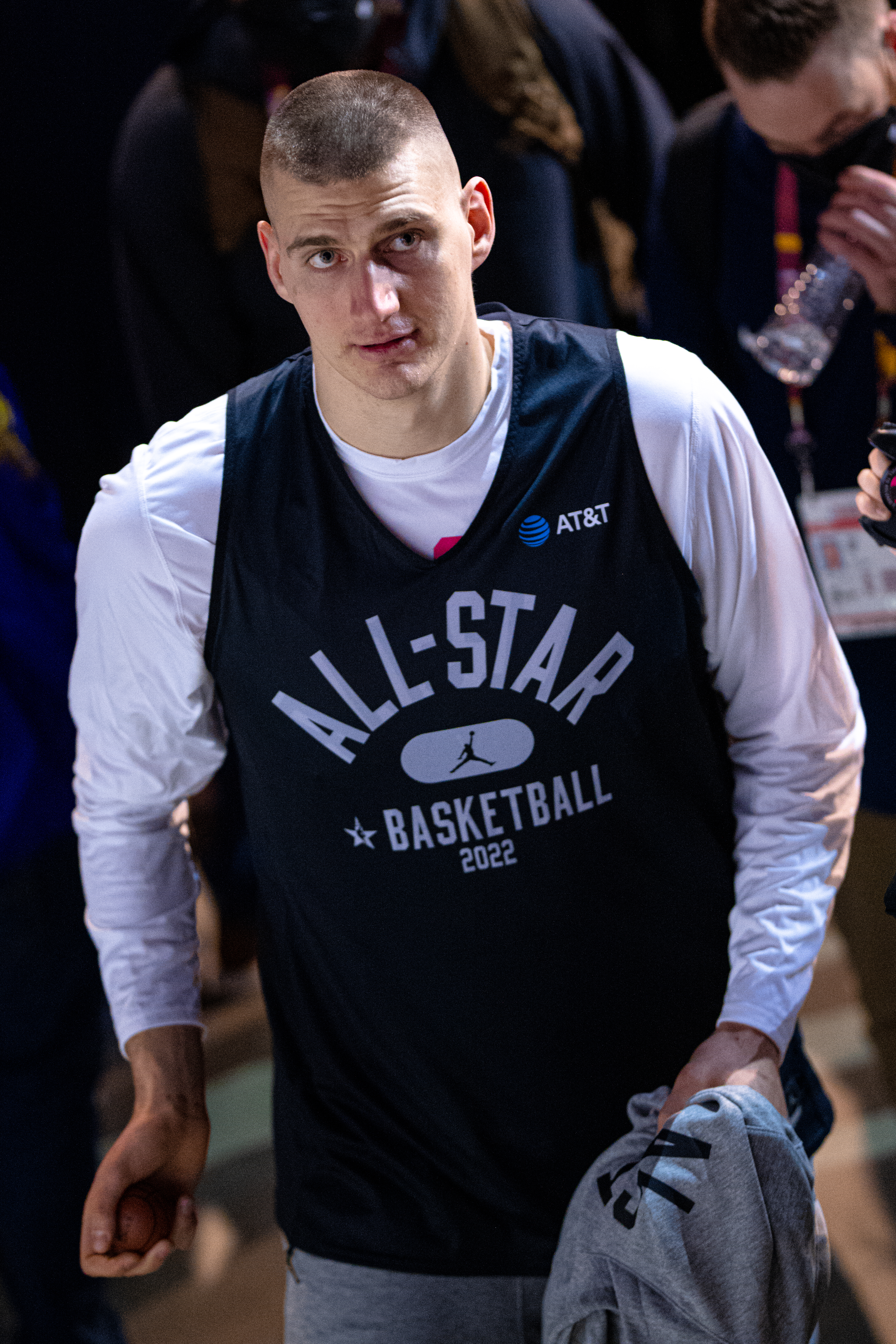
Nikola Jokić became the second player to record a triple-double in his Finals debut.

Nikola Jokić had a triple-double and Jamal Murray contributed 26 points and 10 assists to lead Denver to a 104–93 win in their inaugural NBA Finals appearance. The Nuggets trailed for just 34 seconds in the game, and its largest lead was 24. Michael Porter Jr. recorded his seventh double-double of the playoffs, while Aaron Gordon set the tone by scoring 12 of his 16 points in the opening quarter. Bam Adebayo had 26 points and 13 rebounds for Miami, who made just 41% of their field goals and 33% of their three-pointers. Denver remained unbeaten at home in the playoffs, while the Heat had been 3–0 in their series openers. Miami also dropped to 1–6 all-time in Game 1 of the NBA Finals.

Jokić had 10 points and 10 assists by halftime, when Denver was up 59–42. Through the first three quarters, Miami guarded him with Adebayo, Cody Zeller, and a zone defense, forcing Jokić to become a passer. The Heat went on an 11–0 run to start the fourth quarter, cutting an 84–63 deficit to 84–74. Nuggets coach Michael Malone countered by having Jokić post up closer to the basket, and he scored 12 points in the final period. Miami came within nine points after a 3-pointer by Haywood Highsmith with 2:34 remaining, but did not come any closer. Highsmith finished with 18 points off the bench, while Gabe Vincent hit five 3-pointers for Miami.

Jokić had 27 points on 67% shooting to go along with 14 assists and 10 rebounds, joining Jason Kidd of the then-New Jersey Nets as the only NBA players with a triple-double in their finals debuts. Jokić and Murray also became the second pair of teammates to each put up at least 25 points and 10 assists in a finals game since Magic Johnson and James Worthy in 1987. The Heat's Caleb Martin shot just 1 of 7, and Max Strus was 0 for 10, missing all nine of his 3-pointers. Jimmy Butler, who entered the finals averaging 28.5 points this postseason, scored a playoff-low 13 points. Additionally, Miami was just 2 for 2 on its free throws, tied for the fewest free throws made in a playoff game and breaking the record for fewest attempts in a playoff game.

=== Game 2 ===
ABC

June 4
8:00 pm (6:00 pm MDT)

Recap

Miami Heat 111, Denver Nuggets 108
Scoring by quarter: 26–23, 25–34, 24–26, 36–25
| Pts: Gabe Vincent 23; Rebs: Kevin Love 10; Asts: Jimmy Butler 9 | Pts: Nikola Jokić 41; Rebs: Nikola Jokić 11; Asts: Jamal Murray 10 |
Series tied, 1–1

Ball Arena, Denver, Colorado
Attendance: 19,537
Referees:
- No. 15 Zach Zarba
- No. 10 John Goble
- No. 61 Courtney Kirkland

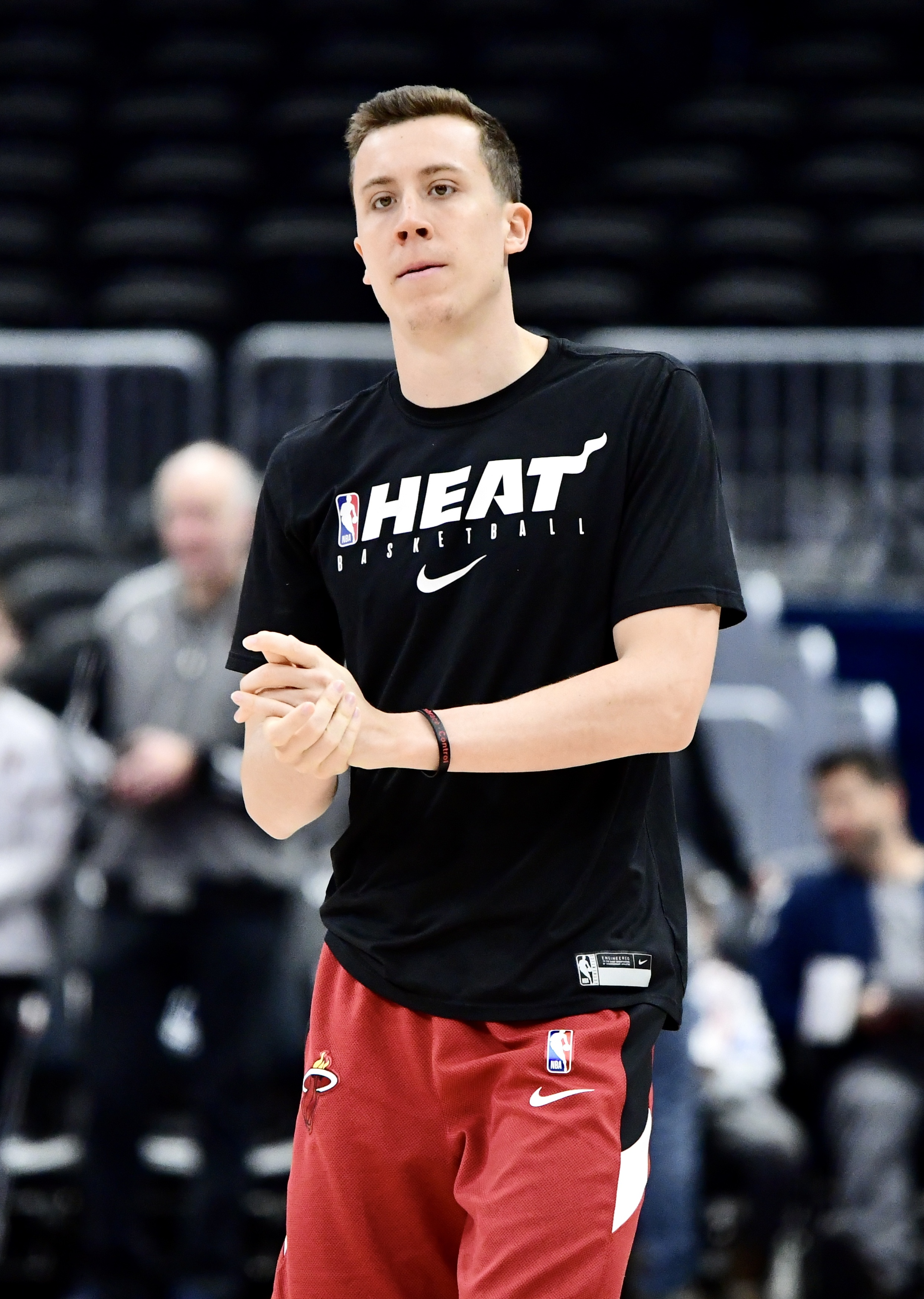
The Heat opened the fourth quarter on a 15–2 run, with Duncan Robinson going 4-for-4 to help Miami regain the lead.

Miami rallied from a 15-point deficit to win 111–108 behind 23 points from Vincent and 21 each from Butler and Adebayo, becoming the first No. 8 seed to win an NBA Finals game on the road. The Heat built an early 21–10 lead with 4:56 left in the opening quarter before the Nuggets went on a 40–14 run over the next 12 minutes, turning the double-digit deficit into a double-digit lead. Down by eight entering the fourth quarter, the Heat outscored Denver 32–12 in the opening 8:21 of the fourth quarter to take a 12-point lead, then frittered most of it away and had to survive a 3-point try by Murray that missed as time expired. Miami knocked down 17 of their 35 threes and converted 18 of 20 free throws after making just two in Game 1. Jokić scored a game-high 41 points but recorded a playoff-low four assists as the Nuggets lost their first home game since March 30.

With Martin dealing with an illness, Miami elected to insert Kevin Love, who did not play in Game 1, into the starting lineup. Strus, who was 0 for 10 in Game 1, had four 3-pointers in the first quarter as the Heat jumped out to an early 11-point lead, but the Nuggets reclaimed momentum early in the second quarter with four 3-pointers in a 70-second span as Miami trailed by as much as 15 in the first half. Despite an 18-point third quarter from Jokić, the Heat hung around to trail by eight entering the fourth quarter. Coming into the game, Denver was undefeated in the playoffs when leading by double digits and boasted a 37–1 record for the season when leading by at least eight points going into the final quarter.

Miami opened the first 2:43 of the fourth quarter with a 15–2 scoring run, highlighted by Duncan Robinson going 4 for 4 from the field to give the Heat their first lead of the second half. Miami managed to build a 12-point advantage with under 3:30 remaining but had to weather a late surge from the Nuggets, who cut the lead to three with 35 seconds remaining. After a missed 3-pointer from Butler, Denver chose not to call a timeout in the closing seconds. Murray attempted a last-second 3-point shot that could have tied the game, but it fell short. Murray finished with 18 points and 10 assists, while Jokić converted 16 of his 28 field goals as the Nuggets dropped to 0–3 this postseason when Jokić scores 40 or more points.

=== Game 3 ===
ABC

June 7
8:30 pm

Recap

Denver Nuggets 109, Miami Heat 94
Scoring by quarter: 24–24, 29–24, 29–20, 27–26
| Pts: Jamal Murray 34; Rebs: Nikola Jokić 21; Asts: Jokić, Murray 10 each | Pts: Jimmy Butler 28; Rebs: Bam Adebayo 17; Asts: Lowry, Strus 5 each |
Denver leads series, 2–1

Kaseya Center, Miami, Florida
Attendance: 20,019
Referees:
- No. 25 Tony Brothers
- No. 58 Josh Tiven
- No. 24 Kevin Scott

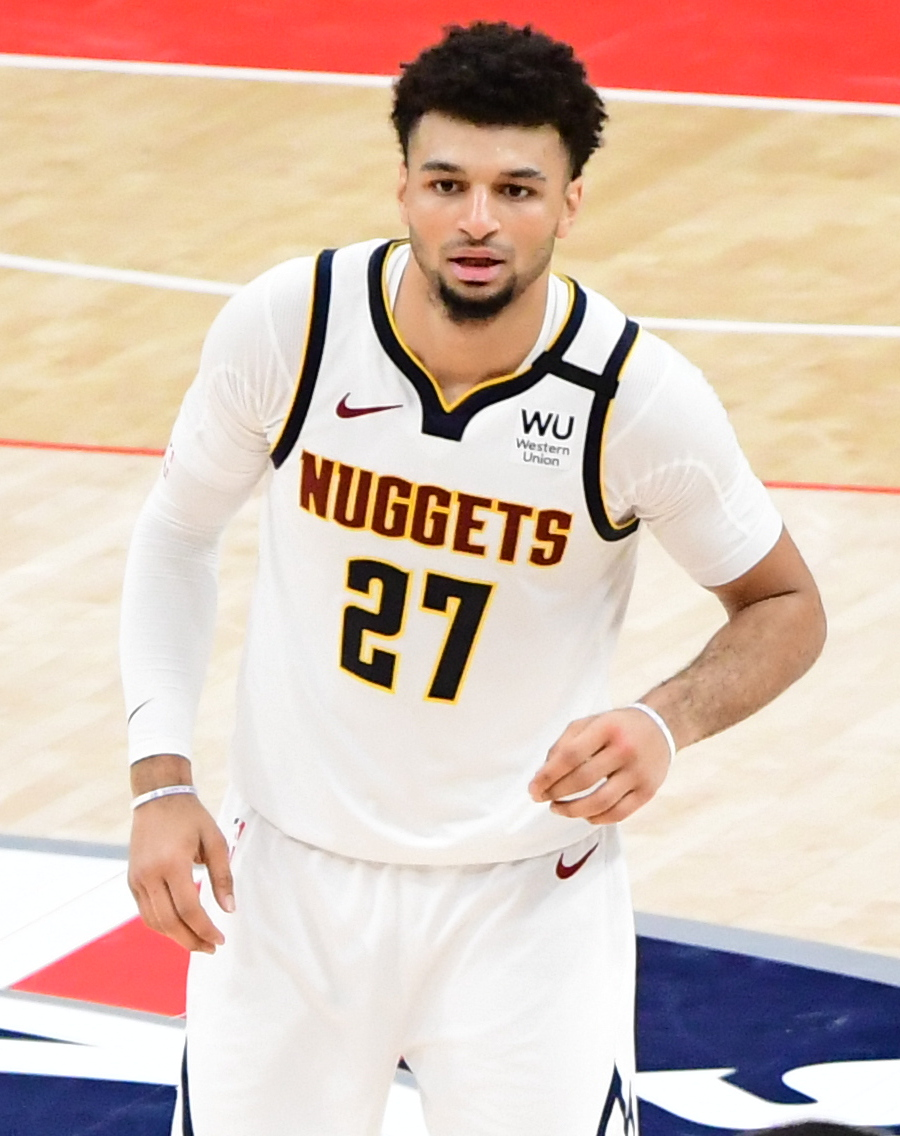
Nikola Jokić and Jamal Murray (pictured) became the first duo in NBA history to each record a 30-point triple-double.

Jokić and Murray became the first pair of teammates in NBA history to each record a 30-point triple-double in the same game as the Nuggets won 109–94, reclaiming the series lead. After a tight first half that saw neither team claim a lead bigger than five, the Heat never led in the second half, as Denver pushed the lead to double digits for the first time early in the third quarter and led by as much as 21 later in the half. The Nuggets won their fourth straight road game, while Miami lost their third straight home game after starting off 6–0 at home this postseason.

Jokić and Murray combined for 24 made field goals, while the entire Heat team managed 34. The duo also contributed significantly on the glass, grabbing a combined 31 rebounds to the Heat's total of 33, while their 20 assists matched Miami's total of 20. For Jokić, this marked his 10th triple-double of the playoffs, further extending his single-season record for triple-doubles in a single playoff run. He finished the game by converting 12 of his 21 shot attempts, while his 32 points, 21 rebounds, and 10 assists made him the first player to record 30-plus points, 20-plus rebounds, and 10-plus assists in a finals game. For Murray, he finished with a game-high 34 points on 55% from the field to go along with 10 boards and 10 assists, joining Magic Johnson and Bob Cousy as the only players in finals history to record 10-plus assists in three consecutive games.

Jokić and Murray also received contributions from their teammates, as Christian Braun scored 15 points on 7-for-8 shooting in 19 minutes off the bench, while Gordon added a double-double as Denver dominated the boards (58 to 33) and points in the paint (60 to 34). For Miami, Butler finished with 28 points, and Adebayo recorded 22 points and 17 rebounds but only made 7 of his 21 shot attempts. Vincent and Strus shot a combined 3 for 17 as the Heat finished the game shooting 37% from the field and 31% from beyond the arc. Udonis Haslem, aged 42 years and 363 days, became the oldest player to play in the NBA Finals; he came off the bench with 29.8 seconds left in the game.

=== Game 4 ===
ABC

June 9
8:30 pm

Recap

Denver Nuggets 108, Miami Heat 95
Scoring by quarter: 20–21, 35–30, 31–22, 22–22
| Pts: Aaron Gordon 27; Rebs: Nikola Jokić 12; Asts: Jamal Murray 12 | Pts: Jimmy Butler 25; Rebs: Bam Adebayo 11; Asts: Butler, Lowry 7 each |
Denver leads series, 3–1

Kaseya Center, Miami, Florida
Attendance: 20,184
Referees:
- No. 48 Scott Foster
- No. 60 James Williams
- No. 55 Bill Kennedy

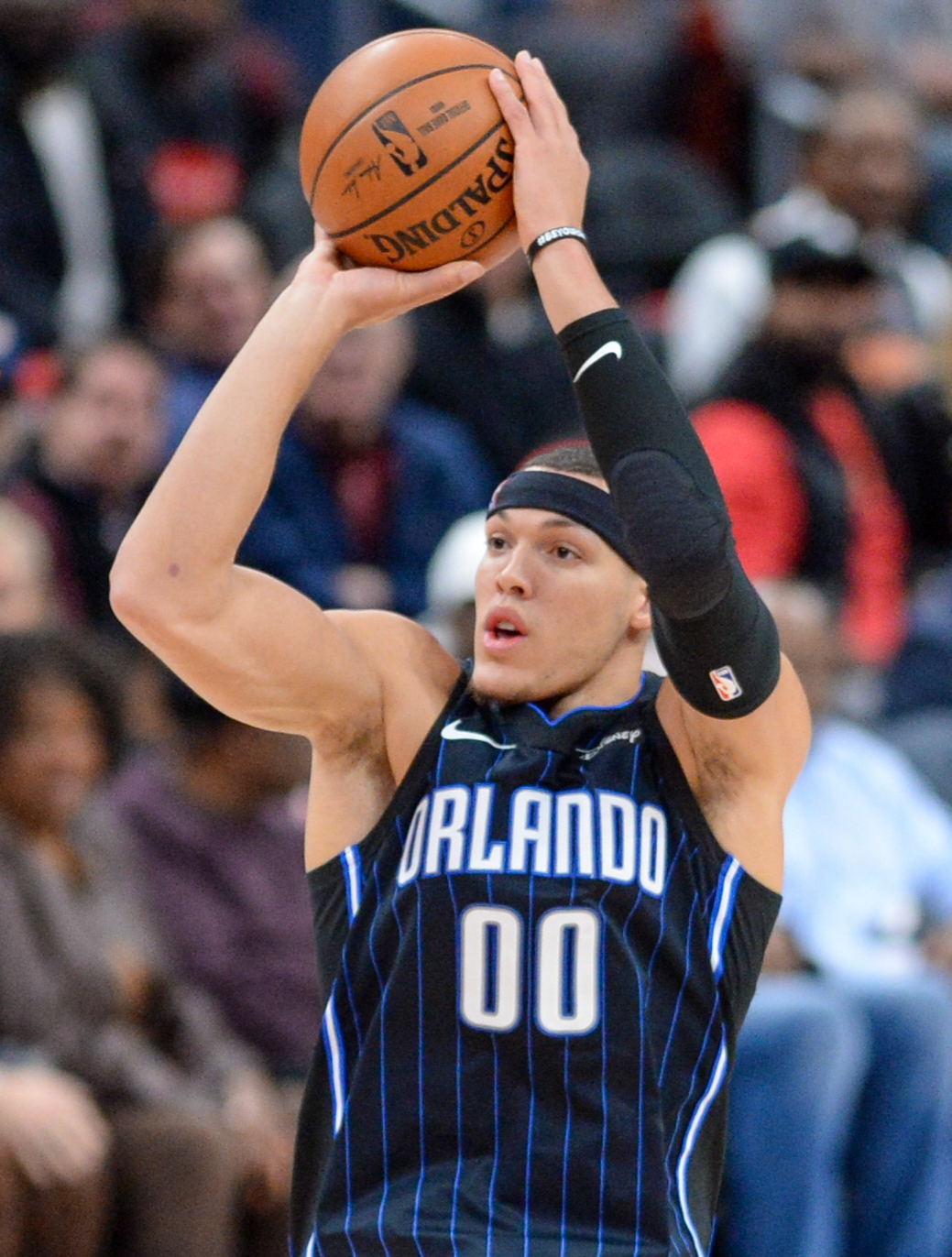
Aaron Gordon's 27 points helped the Nuggets prevent a comeback attempt by the Heat to take a 3–1 series lead.

Gordon dropped a game-high 27 points on 11 of 15 from the field, Jokić chipped in 23 points and 12 rebounds, and Murray recorded 15 points and 12 assists as the Nuggets took a commanding 3–1 series lead back to Denver. Bruce Brown came off the bench and scored 11 of his 21 points in the fourth quarter, thwarting any attempt by the Heat to overcome their eighth double-digit deficit of the playoffs. The Nuggets won their fifth straight road game, improving to 9–1 in their last ten playoff games, while Miami dropped to 2–6 in their last eight games, as they fell into a 3–1 hole for the third consecutive finals appearance.

After neither team could claim a double-digit lead in the first half for the second consecutive game, the Nuggets led by 13 going into the fourth quarter. Similar to their game 2 victory, the Heat scored the first eight points of the quarter, and Jokić committed his fifth foul and had to go to the bench with 9:24 left. Miami narrowed the lead to five with 8:42 remaining, but the Nuggets held firm, as Brown scored 11 points during a 14–4 run down the stretch that gave Denver a 17-point lead, their largest of the night. Murray, who committed seven turnovers in game 3, finished the game with 12 assists and zero turnovers, joining Magic Johnson and Robert Reid as the only players to record 12-plus assists with zero turnovers in a finals game.

Butler led the Heat with 25 points, seven rebounds, and seven assists, while Adebayo had 20 points, 11 rebounds, and seven turnovers. Kyle Lowry chipped in with 13 points and seven assists off the bench, but the starting backcourt of Strus and Vincent scored just two points on 1 of 10 shooting as the Heat were held to under 100 points for the third time this series. The Nuggets made 14 of their 28 3-pointers, while Miami shot just 32% from deep and committed 15 turnovers after having just four in game 3. Jokić and Kentavious Caldwell-Pope combined for six steals and five blocks, while the entire Heat team finished with just two steals and three blocks. Jokić also became the first player in NBA history to put up at least 500 points, 250 rebounds, and 150 assists in a single postseason run.

=== Game 5 ===
ABC

June 12
8:30 pm (6:30 pm MDT)

Recap

Miami Heat 89, Denver Nuggets 94
Scoring by quarter: 24–22, 27–22, 20–26, 18–24
| Pts: Jimmy Butler 21; Rebs: Bam Adebayo 12; Asts: Jimmy Butler 5 | Pts: Nikola Jokić 28; Rebs: Nikola Jokić 16; Asts: Jamal Murray 8 |
Denver wins NBA Finals, 4–1

Ball Arena, Denver, Colorado
Attendance: 19,537
Referees:
- No. 8 Marc Davis
- No. 16 David Guthrie
- No. 58 Josh Tiven

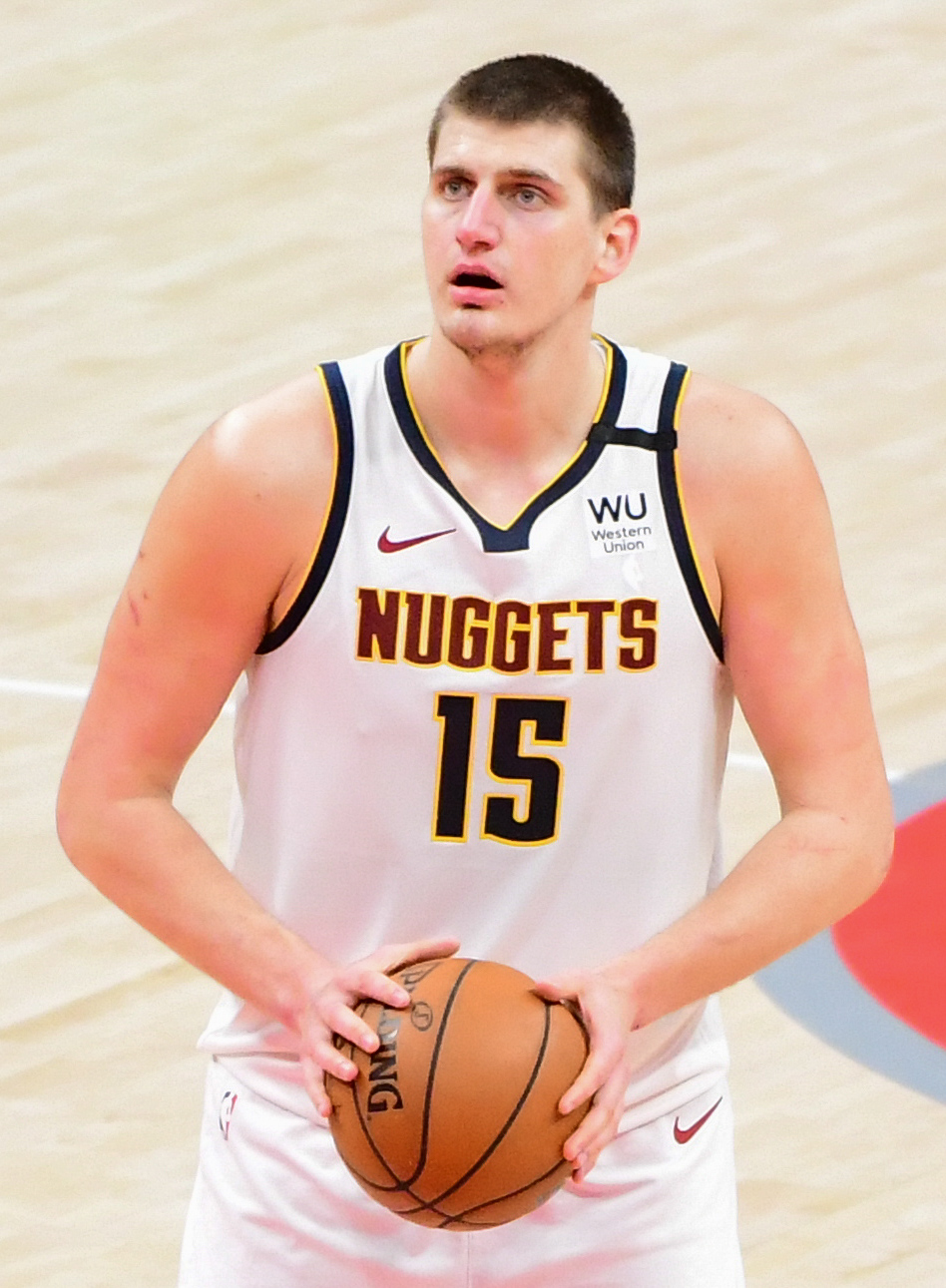
Nikola Jokić was awarded Finals MVP, becoming the first center to win the award since Shaquille O'Neal in 2002.

In a closely contested Game 5, Jokić propelled the Nuggets to their first NBA championship in franchise history with a hard-fought 94–89 victory over the Heat. His dominant performance, including 28 points and 16 rebounds, earned him the Finals MVP award. He became the lowest-selected player to ever win Finals MVP, being the 41st pick of the 2014 NBA draft. The Nuggets struggled with their shooting throughout the game, particularly from beyond the arc, as they missed 20 of their first 22 three-point attempts; however, Jokic's efficient 12 of 16 shooting from the field provided a much-needed boost, as he was the only starter across both teams to shoot over 50% from the field. Jokić, who averaged 30 points, 13.5 rebounds, and 9.5 assists throughout the playoffs, became the first player in NBA history to lead the league in points (600), rebounds (269), and assists (190) in a single postseason.

Prior to the game, Miami announced that Tyler Herro was listed as active for the first time since he broke his hand in the first round against the Milwaukee Bucks. The Heat trailed by eight early in the first quarter, but a 31–13 run by Miami turned the deficit into a 10-point lead, their largest since Game 2. Adebayo scored 18 of his 20 points in the first half to give the Heat their first halftime lead of the series. The Nuggets, who entered the game with a series shooting average of 37.6% from three-point range, shot a historically poor 6.7% from three-point range in the first half. Additionally, Denver committed 10 turnovers in the first half and missed 10 of their first 19 free throws. Despite their shooting struggles, the Nuggets showed their resiliency, as they stormed back to take an 83–76 lead with 4:43 left in the fourth quarter.

Butler, who made just two field goals in the first 43 minutes of the game, scored 13 consecutive points for Miami to give them a one-point lead with two minutes to go; however, an offensive rebound and tip-in by Brown swung the momentum back in favor of the Nuggets. After a steal and two free throws from Pope, Butler missed a contested 3-pointer and Brown hit free throws in the final seconds to seal the win for Denver. Murray contributed 14 points, eight rebounds, and eight assists, while Porter Jr. recorded 16 points and 13 rebounds for the Nuggets. Butler finished with 21 points on 5 for 18 from the field for the Heat, and Adebayo recorded his fourth 20-point double-double of the series. Although Herro was listed as available, coach Erik Spoelstra elected not to play him. Miami's shooting woes ultimately proved costly, as they shot an inadequate 26% from three-point range and 34% from the field, their lowest percentage of the season.

Denver became the second original ABA franchise, along with the San Antonio Spurs, to win an NBA championship. It was the Nuggets' first league championship after 56 combined years in the ABA and NBA. Denver was also the first Western Conference team from outside the states of California or Texas to win the championship since the 1978–79 Seattle SuperSonics. This was the final game of Haslem's NBA career, as he retired the following month.

== Rosters ==
=== Denver Nuggets ===
2022–23 Denver Nuggets roster
Players

| Pos. | No. | Player | Height | Weight | DOB | From |
|---|---|---|---|---|---|---|
| G | 0 | Christian Braun | 6 ft 6 in (1.98 m) | 220 lb (100 kg) | 2001-04-17 | Kansas |
| G/F | 11 | Bruce Brown | 6 ft 4 in (1.93 m) | 202 lb (92 kg) | 1996-08-15 | Miami (FL) |
| C | 13 | Thomas Bryant | 6 ft 10 in (2.08 m) | 248 lb (112 kg) | 1997-07-31 | Indiana |
| G | 5 | Kentavious Caldwell-Pope | 6 ft 5 in (1.96 m) | 204 lb (93 kg) | 1993-02-18 | Georgia |
| F | 31 | Vlatko Čančar | 6 ft 8 in (2.03 m) | 236 lb (107 kg) | 1997-04-10 | Slovenia |
| G | 21 | Collin Gillespie (TW) | 6 ft 1 in (1.85 m) | 195 lb (88 kg) | 1999-06-25 | Villanova |
| F | 50 | Aaron Gordon | 6 ft 8 in (2.03 m) | 235 lb (107 kg) | 1995-09-16 | Arizona |
| F | 32 | Jeff Green | 6 ft 8 in (2.03 m) | 235 lb (107 kg) | 1986-08-28 | Georgetown |
| G | 7 | Reggie Jackson | 6 ft 2 in (1.88 m) | 208 lb (94 kg) | 1990-04-16 | Boston College |
| C | 15 | Nikola Jokić | 6 ft 11 in (2.11 m) | 284 lb (129 kg) | 1995-02-19 | Serbia |
| C | 6 | DeAndre Jordan | 6 ft 11 in (2.11 m) | 265 lb (120 kg) | 1988-07-21 | Texas A&M |
| G | 27 | Jamal Murray | 6 ft 4 in (1.93 m) | 215 lb (98 kg) | 1997-02-23 | Kentucky |
| F/C | 22 | Zeke Nnaji | 6 ft 9 in (2.06 m) | 240 lb (109 kg) | 2001-01-09 | Arizona |
| F | 1 | Michael Porter Jr. | 6 ft 10 in (2.08 m) | 218 lb (99 kg) | 1998-06-29 | Missouri |
| G | 14 | Ish Smith | 6 ft 0 in (1.83 m) | 175 lb (79 kg) | 1988-07-05 | Wake Forest |
| G/F | 8 | Peyton Watson | 6 ft 7 in (2.01 m) | 200 lb (91 kg) | 2002-09-11 | UCLA |
| F | 10 | Jack White (TW) | 6 ft 7 in (2.01 m) | 225 lb (102 kg) | 1997-08-05 | Duke |

Coaches
Head coach
- Michael Malone
Assistant(s)
- David Adelman
- John Beckett
- Ryan Bowen
- Popeye Jones
- Charles Klask
- Ryan Saunders
- Ognjen Stojaković
- Elvis Valcarcel

Legend
- (DP) Unsigned draft pick
- (FA) Free agent
- (S) Suspended
- (GL) On assignment to G League
- (TW) Two-way affiliate player
- Injured

Roster
Updated: February 14, 2023

=== Miami Heat ===
2022–23 Miami Heat roster
Players

| Pos. | No. | Player | Height | Weight | DOB | From |
|---|---|---|---|---|---|---|
| F/C | 13 | Bam Adebayo | 6 ft 9 in (2.06 m) | 255 lb (116 kg) | 1997-07-18 | Kentucky |
| F | 22 | Jimmy Butler | 6 ft 7 in (2.01 m) | 230 lb (104 kg) | 1989-09-14 | Marquette |
| F | 8 | Jamal Cain (TW) | 6 ft 7 in (2.01 m) | 191 lb (87 kg) | 1999-03-20 | Oakland |
| F | 40 | Udonis Haslem | 6 ft 7 in (2.01 m) | 235 lb (107 kg) | 1980-06-09 | Florida |
| G | 14 | Tyler Herro | 6 ft 5 in (1.96 m) | 195 lb (88 kg) | 2000-01-20 | Kentucky |
| F | 24 | Haywood Highsmith | 6 ft 5 in (1.96 m) | 220 lb (100 kg) | 1996-12-09 | Wheeling |
| F | 5 | Nikola Jović | 6 ft 10 in (2.08 m) | 205 lb (93 kg) | 2003-06-09 | Serbia |
| F | 42 | Kevin Love | 6 ft 8 in (2.03 m) | 251 lb (114 kg) | 1988-09-07 | UCLA |
| G | 7 | Kyle Lowry | 6 ft 0 in (1.83 m) | 196 lb (89 kg) | 1986-03-25 | Villanova |
| F | 16 | Caleb Martin | 6 ft 5 in (1.96 m) | 205 lb (93 kg) | 1995-09-28 | Nevada |
| G | 4 | Victor Oladipo | 6 ft 3 in (1.91 m) | 213 lb (97 kg) | 1992-05-04 | Indiana |
| G | 55 | Duncan Robinson | 6 ft 7 in (2.01 m) | 215 lb (98 kg) | 1994-04-22 | Michigan |
| F/C | 25 | Orlando Robinson (TW) | 6 ft 10 in (2.08 m) | 235 lb (107 kg) | 2000-07-10 | Fresno State |
| G/F | 31 | Max Strus | 6 ft 5 in (1.96 m) | 215 lb (98 kg) | 1996-03-28 | DePaul |
| G | 2 | Gabe Vincent | 6 ft 2 in (1.88 m) | 200 lb (91 kg) | 1996-06-14 | UC Santa Barbara |
| C | 77 | Ömer Yurtseven | 6 ft 11 in (2.11 m) | 275 lb (125 kg) | 1998-06-19 | Georgetown |
| C | 44 | Cody Zeller | 6 ft 11 in (2.11 m) | 240 lb (109 kg) | 1992-10-05 | Indiana |

Coaches
Head coach
- Erik Spoelstra
Assistant(s)
- Malik Allen
- Caron Butler
- Anthony Carter
- Octavio De La Grana
- Eric Glass
- Chris Quinn

Legend
- (DP) Unsigned draft pick
- (FA) Free agent
- (S) Suspended
- (GL) On assignment to G League affiliate
- (TW) Two-way affiliate player
- Injured

Roster
Updated: March 18, 2023

== Player statistics ==
Legend
| GP | Games played | GS | Games started | MPG | Minutes per game |
| FG% | Field-goal percentage | 3P% | 3-point field-goal percentage | FT% | Free-throw percentage |
| RPG | Rebounds per game | APG | Assists per game | SPG | Steals per game |
| BPG | Blocks per game | PPG | Points per game |

Miami Heat statistics
| Player | GP | GS | MPG | FG% | 3P% | FT% | RPG | APG | SPG | BPG | PPG |
|---|---|---|---|---|---|---|---|---|---|---|---|
| Bam Adebayo | 5 | 5 | **41.8** | .455 | .000 | .905 | **12.4** | 3.2 | 0.4 | **0.8** | **21.8** |
| Jimmy Butler | 5 | 5 | 41.0 | .413 | .368 | .806 | 4.6 | **6.4** | 0.8 | 0.6 | 21.6 |
| Gabe Vincent | 5 | 5 | 28.4 | .382 | .333 | .833 | 0.4 | 2.4 | **1.0** | 0.2 | 11.4 |
| Max Strus | 5 | 5 | 25.0 | .233 | .188 | .750 | 4.8 | 3.0 | 0.2 | 0.6 | 5.8 |
| Kevin Love | 4 | 4 | 17.8 | .375 | .400 | **1.000** | 4.5 | 0.3 | 0.8 | 0.5 | 6.8 |
| Caleb Martin | 5 | 1 | 28.4 | .375 | .333 | **1.000** | 4.4 | 1.2 | **1.0** | 0.6 | 7.4 |
| Kyle Lowry | 5 | 0 | 29.2 | .425 | .423 | **1.000** | 4.0 | 4.8 | **1.0** | 0.2 | 10.8 |
| Duncan Robinson | 5 | 0 | 18.8 | .500 | .429 | .000 | 1.2 | 1.6 | 0.2 | 0.4 | 7.8 |
| Haywood Highsmith | 5 | 0 | 7.0 | **.700** | **.500** | **1.000** | 0.8 | 0.0 | 0.4 | 0.2 | 3.6 |
| Cody Zeller | 5 | 0 | 5.4 | .500 | — | — | 1.0 | 0.2 | 0.0 | 0.2 | 0.8 |
| Nikola Jović | 2 | 0 | 1.0 | .000 | — | — | 0.5 | 0.0 | 0.0 | 0.0 | 0.0 |
| Ömer Yurtseven | 2 | 0 | 1.0 | .000 | .000 | — | 0.5 | 0.0 | 0.0 | 0.0 | 0.0 |
| Udonis Haslem | 1 | 0 | 0.0 | .000 | — | — | 0.0 | 0.0 | 0.0 | 0.0 | 0.0 |

Denver Nuggets statistics
| Player | GP | GS | MPG | FG% | 3P% | FT% | RPG | APG | SPG | BPG | PPG |
|---|---|---|---|---|---|---|---|---|---|---|---|
| Nikola Jokić | 5 | 5 | 41.2 | .583 | .421 | .838 | **14.0** | 7.2 | 0.8 | **1.4** | **30.2** |
| Jamal Murray | 5 | 5 | **42.2** | .451 | .387 | .929 | 6.2 | **10.0** | 1.0 | 0.0 | 21.4 |
| Aaron Gordon | 5 | 5 | 35.6 | .604 | .556 | .467 | 7.4 | 3.0 | 0.8 | 0.6 | 14.0 |
| Michael Porter Jr. | 5 | 5 | 29.4 | .328 | .143 | .750 | 8.4 | 0.8 | 0.0 | 0.4 | 9.6 |
| Kentavious Caldwell-Pope | 5 | 5 | 34.2 | .355 | .263 | .769 | 3.4 | 1.4 | **1.4** | 1.2 | 7.4 |
| Bruce Brown | 5 | 0 | 26.8 | .457 | .368 | .727 | 4.4 | 1.0 | 1.0 | 0.8 | 11.4 |
| Christian Braun | 5 | 0 | 16.4 | .706 | .000 | .556 | 2.0 | 1.2 | 1.0 | 0.4 | 5.8 |
| Jeff Green | 5 | 0 | 13.0 | **.889** | **1.000** | **1.000** | 0.4 | 0.6 | 0.2 | 0.0 | 4.8 |
| DeAndre Jordan | 1 | 0 | 3.0 | — | — | — | 0.0 | 0.0 | 0.0 | 1.0 | 0.0 |
| Reggie Jackson | 1 | 0 | 1.0 | .000 | .000 | — | 1.0 | 1.0 | 0.0 | 0.0 | 0.0 |
| Thomas Bryant | 1 | 0 | 0.0 | — | — | — | 0.0 | 0.0 | 0.0 | 0.0 | 0.0 |
| Vlatko Čančar | 1 | 0 | 0.0 | — | — | — | 0.0 | 0.0 | 0.0 | 0.0 | 0.0 |
| Zeke Nnaji | 1 | 0 | 0.0 | — | — | — | 0.0 | 0.0 | 0.0 | 0.0 | 0.0 |
| Peyton Watson | 1 | 0 | 0.0 | — | — | — | 0.0 | 0.0 | 0.0 | 0.0 | 0.0 |

- Bold: team high

== Media coverage ==
The Finals were televised in the United States by ABC (including Denver's KMGH-TV and Miami's WPLG) for the 21st consecutive year. Game 1 received an alternate presentation anchored by Stephen A. Smith on ESPN2 and streamed on ESPN+ as NBA in Stephen A's World.

Same as before, the series was called by Mike Breen on play-by-play with Mark Jackson and Jeff Van Gundy as analysts, and Lisa Salters as the sideline reporter. This marked the record 15th and final NBA Finals called by the trio of Breen, Jackson and Van Gundy, and the 14th full series overall. (Note: Games 1 and 2 of the 2022 NBA Finals were called by Mark Jones alongside Mark Jackson and Lisa Salters. Jeff Van Gundy returned in Game 2 while Mike Breen returned in Game 3 after undergoing quarantine due to COVID-19.) Van Gundy also set the record for calling his 17th NBA Finals as an analyst, however he was one of several personnel laid off by ESPN on June 30, 2023. On July 31, Jackson was also laid off by ESPN. ESPN Radio also broadcast the Finals, with Marc Kestecher and Doris Burke as commentators. Until 2026, this was Burke's last Finals assignment for ESPN Radio, as she worked with the lead broadcast team in 2024 and 2025.

=== Viewership ===
| Game | Ratings (American households) | American audience (in millions) | Ref |
|---|---|---|---|
| 1 | 6.0 | 11.58 | |
| 2 | 6.0 | 11.91 | |
| 3 | 6.0 | 11.24 | |
| 4 | 5.4 | 10.41 | |
| 5 | 7.0 | 13.08 | |
| Avg | 6.1 | 11.64 | |

== Celebration ==
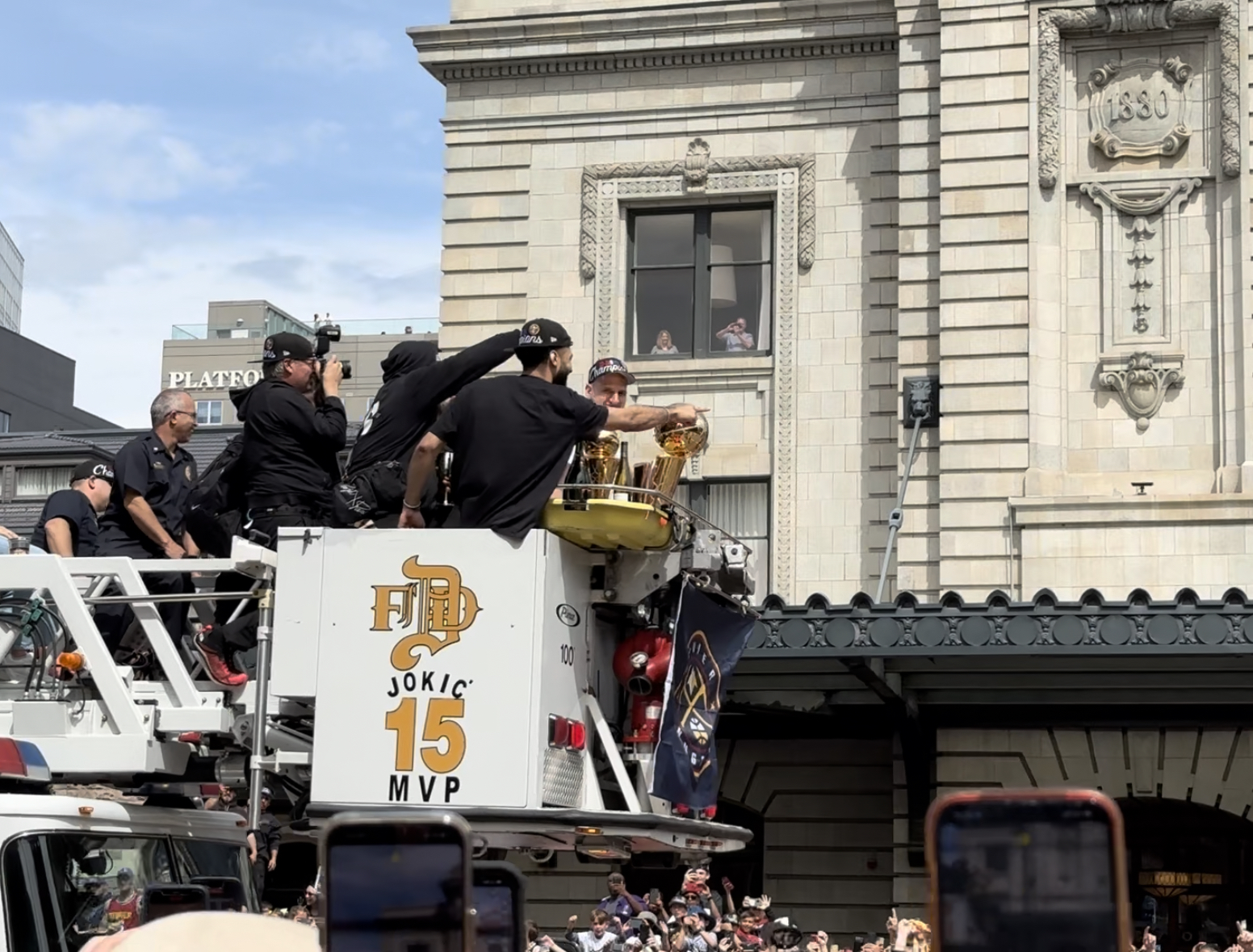
Jokić and Murray with the Larry O'Brien Championship Trophy

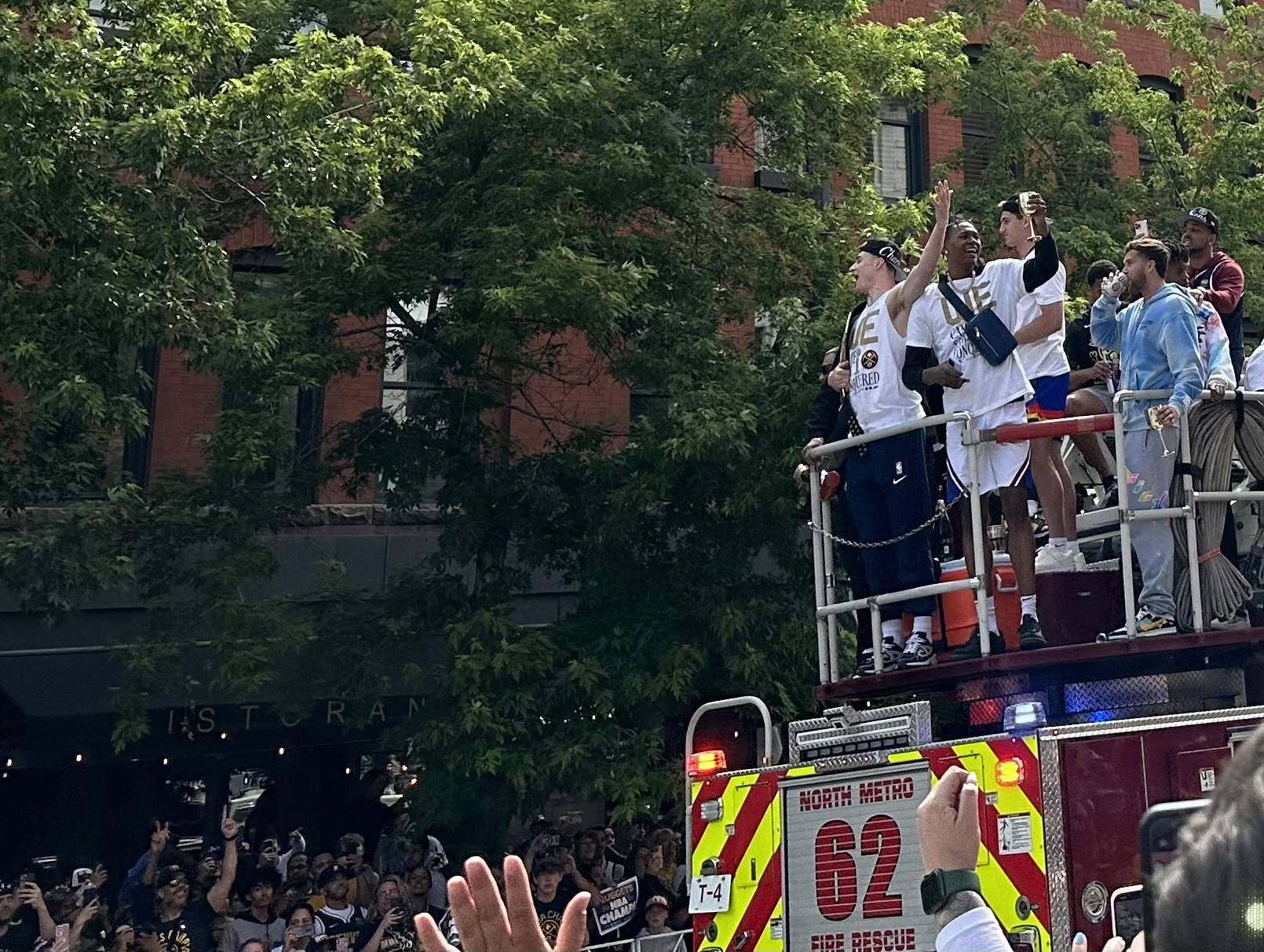
Nuggets players celebrating during parade

Following the Nuggets' win, a parade from Union Station to Civic Center Park in Denver was scheduled for 10 a.m. on June 15, with a pre-parade rally an hour before the parade. The parade was planned to emulate the celebration which followed the 2022 Stanley Cup Final victory by the Colorado Avalanche.

During the celebrations in downtown Denver immediately following the Nuggets championship win, there were two shootings that resulted in at least eleven people being shot, including one suspect. On the 2000 block of Market Street, the Denver Police Department said nine victims were identified as injured, with an injured suspect located nearby, all with gunshot wounds. Another shooting was reported on 17th Street and Blake Street, with Denver police reporting one victim self-transported to a hospital. Three of those shot were reported as in critical condition as of the morning of June 13, with the remainder not sustaining life-threatening injuries. The celebrations in downtown Denver had been described as "raucous", with fireworks detonating and men climbing streetlights near Coors Field and many fans cheering in McGregor Square.

During the parade on June 15, a Denver police officer was struck in the lower leg by a fire truck which was transporting multiple Nuggets players, including Nikola Jokić and Jamal Murray. Jokić's wife, Natalija, was hit in the face with a beer can while riding on the fire truck during the parade.

== See also ==
- 2023 Stanley Cup Final, which featured the Miami adjacent Florida Panthers
