= Will Riley =

Canadian basketball player (born 2006)

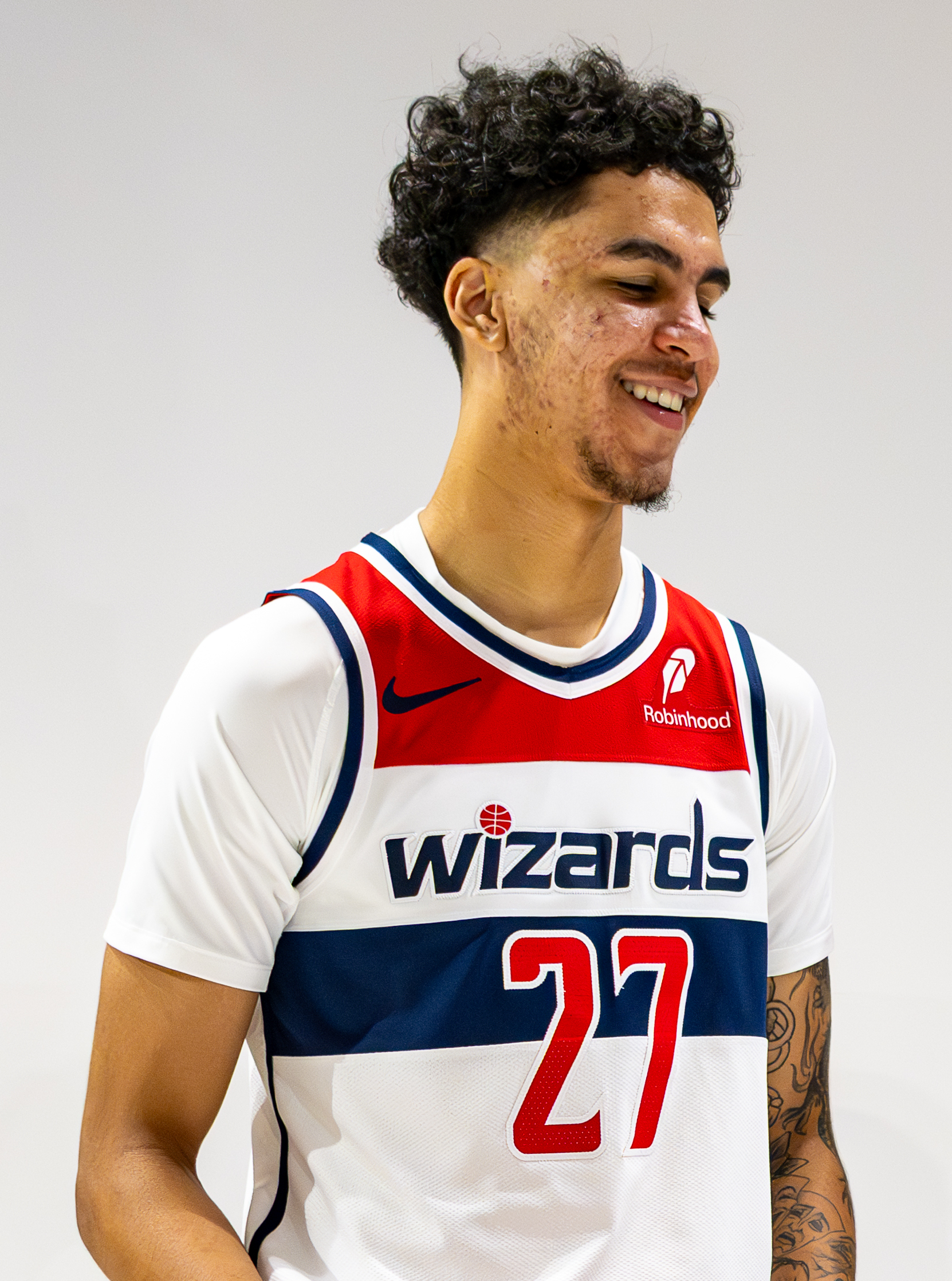
- Riley with the Washington Wizards in 2025

No. 27 – Washington Wizards
- Position: Small forward
- League: NBA

Personal information
- Born: February 10, 2006 (age 20) Kitchener, Ontario, Canada
- Listed height: 6 ft 9 in (2.06 m)
- Listed weight: 180 lb (82 kg)

Career information
- High school: Southwest Academy Prep (London, Ontario); Preston (Cambridge, Ontario); Grand River (Kitchener, Ontario); The Phelps School (Malvern, Pennsylvania)
- College: Illinois (2024–2025)
- NBA draft: 2025: 1st round, 21st overall pick
- Drafted by: Utah Jazz
- Playing career: 2025–present

Career history
- 2025–present: Washington Wizards

Career highlights
- Big Ten Sixth Man of the Year (2025)
- Stats at NBA.com
- Stats at Basketball Reference

William Riley (born February 10, 2006) is a Canadian professional basketball player for the Washington Wizards of the National Basketball Association (NBA). He played college basketball for the Illinois Fighting Illini.

== High school career ==
Riley attended high school at Southwest Academy Prep in London, Ontario with brief stops at Preston High School and Grand River Collegiate Institute. He then attended The Phelps School in Malvern, Pennsylvania where he spent the last two years of his high school career.

He averaged 21.9 points, 4.7 rebounds and 2.5 assists per game in the EYBL and was named Offensive MVP of the EYBL Indy Session, starring for UPlay Canada.

He was named MVP of the 2024 Basketball Without Borders Global Camp during NBA All-Star weekend.

=== Recruiting ===
He was ranked as the top-ranked Canadian prospect and No. 9 overall by 247Sports, No. 10 by On3 and No. 11 by Rivals in the class of 2025. On June 23, 2024, Riley committed to University of Illinois Urbana-Champaign. He was originally part of the class of 2025 but reclassified to 2024 to join earlier. At the time of his signing, Riley was the highest-ranked recruit signed by Illinois in the internet era, surpassing Dee Brown from the class of 2002.

College recruiting
Name	Hometown	School	Height	Weight	Commit date
Will Riley; SF	Kitchener, ON	The Phelps School	6 ft 8 in (2.03 m)	180 lb (82 kg)	Jun 23, 2024
Will Riley; SF	Recruit ratings: Rivals: 247Sports: On3: ESPN:				
Overall recruit ranking: Rivals: 11 247Sports: 10 On3: 20
Note: In many cases, Scout, Rivals, 247Sports, On3, and ESPN may conflict in their listings of height and weight.; In these cases, the average was taken. ESPN grades are on a 100-point scale.; Sources: "2024 Illinois Commits". Rivals.; "ESPN- Illinois Fighting Illini Men's Basketball Recruiting". ESPN.; "2024 Team Ranking". Rivals.; "Will Riley". 247Sports.; "Will Riley". On3.

== College career ==
On November 11, 2024, Riley was named the first Big Ten Freshman of the Week for the 2024–25 season. Riley's overall week (averaging 22.5 points and seven rebounds per game) in two Illinois wins, as well as his securing the Illini freshman scoring record, tipped the scales in his favor. He went on to receive the award twice more. Following the Big Ten regular season's conclusion, he was named Big Ten Sixth Man of the Year. He later declared for the 2025 NBA draft, and received a green room invite in the second wave of invitations on June 16.

== Professional career ==
In the 2025 NBA draft, Riley was selected in the first round with the 21st overall pick by the Utah Jazz and traded to the Washington Wizards. He made his professional debut with the Wizards on October 22, 2025, scoring two points in a 133–120 loss against the Milwaukee Bucks. On April 5, 2026, Riley became the first Wizards rookie since Calbert Cheaney in February 1994 to record consecutive 30-point games. Additionally, Riley became the youngest player since Lebron James in 2004 to record at least 30 points and five steals in one game.

== Career statistics ==
Legend
GP	Games played	GS	Games started	MPG	Minutes per game
FG%	Field goal percentage	3P%	3-point field goal percentage	FT%	Free throw percentage
RPG	Rebounds per game	APG	Assists per game	SPG	Steals per game
BPG	Blocks per game	PPG	Points per game	**Bold**	Career high

=== NBA ===
Year	Team	GP	GS	MPG	FG%	3P%	FT%	RPG	APG	SPG	BPG	PPG
2025–26	Washington	74	18	22.1	.439	.316	.800	2.9	2.0	.7	.1	10.3
Career		74	18	22.1	.439	.316	.800	2.9	2.0	.7	.1	10.3

=== College ===
Year	Team	GP	GS	MPG	FG%	3P%	FT%	RPG	APG	SPG	BPG	PPG
2024–25	Illinois	35	9	25.7	.432	.326	.724	4.1	2.2	.3	.3	12.6
