= Kyle Lowry =

American basketball player (born 1986)

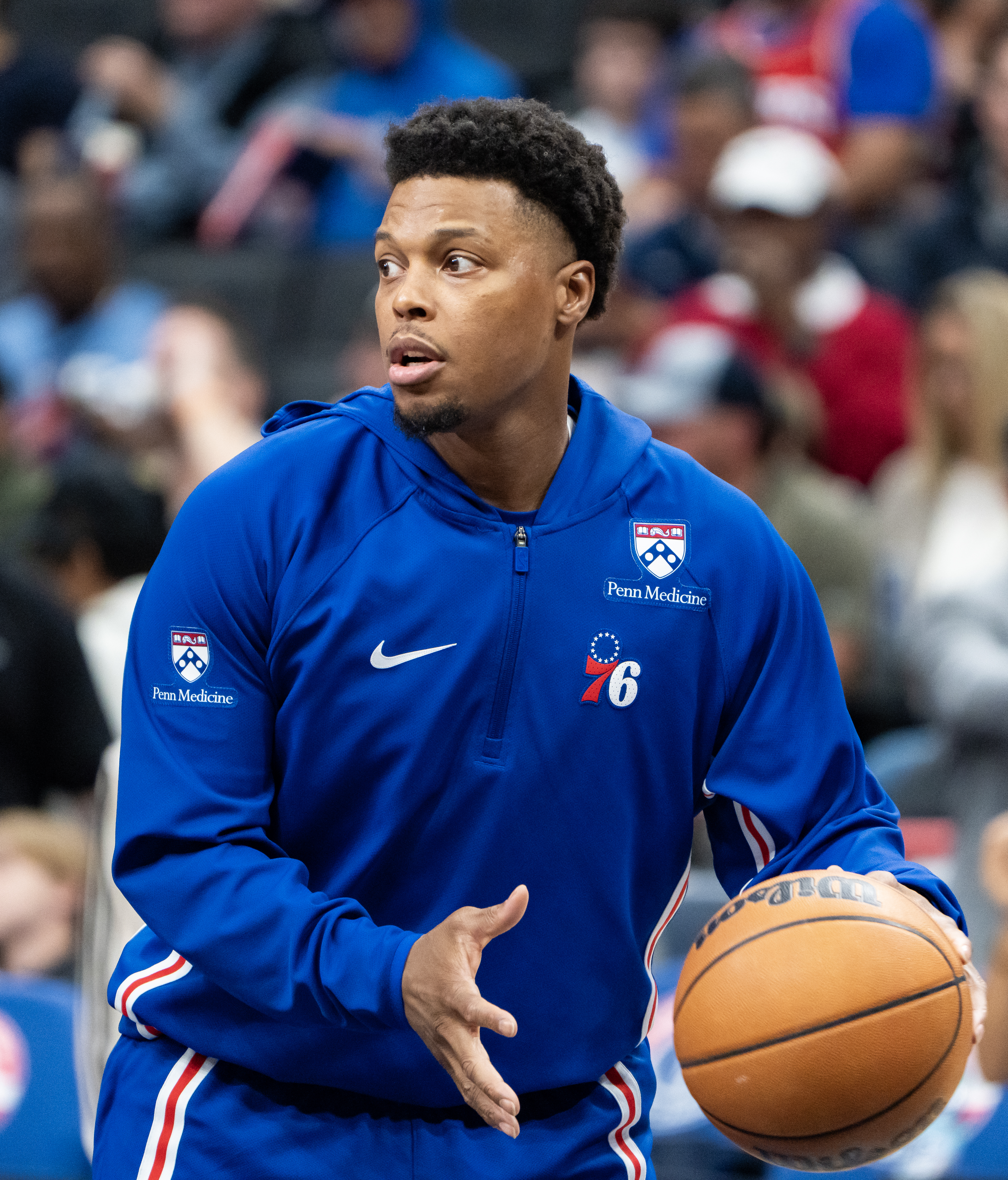
- Lowry with the Philadelphia 76ers in 2026

Toronto Tempo
- Title: Minority owner
- League: WNBA

Personal information
- Born: March 25, 1986 (age 40) Philadelphia, Pennsylvania, U.S.
- Listed height: 6 ft 0 in (1.83 m)
- Listed weight: 196 lb (89 kg)

Career information
- High school: Cardinal Dougherty (Philadelphia, Pennsylvania)
- College: Villanova (2004–2006)
- NBA draft: 2006: 1st round, 24th overall pick
- Drafted by: Memphis Grizzlies
- Playing career: 2006–2026
- Position: Point guard
- Number: 1, 7, 3

Career history
- 2006–2009: Memphis Grizzlies
- 2009–2012: Houston Rockets
- 2012–2021: Toronto Raptors
- 2021–2024: Miami Heat
- 2024–2026: Philadelphia 76ers

Career highlights
- NBA champion (2019); 6× NBA All-Star (2015–2020); All-NBA Third Team (2016); Second-team All-Big East (2006); Big East All-Freshman Team (2005); No. 1 retired by Villanova Wildcats

Career statistics
- Points: 16,373 (13.8 ppg)
- Rebounds: 4,970 (4.2 rpg)
- Assists: 7,110 (6.0 apg)
- Stats at NBA.com
- Stats at Basketball Reference
Medals
Men's basketball
Representing the United States
Olympic Games
| Gold medal – first place | 2016 Rio de Janeiro | Team |

Kyle Terrell Lowry (born March 25, 1986) is an American former professional basketball player, and a minority owner of the Toronto Tempo of the Women's National Basketball Association (WNBA). Lowry played twenty seasons in the National Basketball Association (NBA). A six-time All-Star, he was named to the All-NBA Third Team in 2016 and won an NBA championship with the Toronto Raptors in 2019, their first and only title in franchise history. He is widely regarded as one of the greatest Raptors players of all time due to his work with turning the franchise around, from the post-Chris Bosh era to their first-ever championship in 2019. As starting point guard, Lowry played an integral role in the Raptors' success from 2012 to 2021. Lowry was also a member of the U.S. national team that won a gold medal in the 2016 Summer Olympics.

Lowry played two seasons of college basketball with the Villanova Wildcats before he was selected by the Memphis Grizzlies in the first round of the 2006 NBA draft with the 24th overall pick. He appeared in three seasons with the Grizzlies before being traded to the Houston Rockets in February 2009. After spending four seasons in Houston, he was traded to Toronto during the 2012 off-season, forming a backcourt duo with DeMar DeRozan. In his second season with the Raptors, he helped them reach the playoffs for the first time in six years and win an Atlantic Division title during the 2013–14 season. In 2015–16, he led the Raptors to a then franchise-record of 56 wins, as well as helping the team make the Eastern Conference finals for the first time. In 2021, Lowry was traded to the Miami Heat, where he helped the team reach the 2023 NBA Finals. He later played for the Philadelphia 76ers from 2024 until 2026, when he signed a one-day contract to retire with the Raptors.

== Early life ==
Born and raised in North Philadelphia, Lowry is one of two sons of Marie Holloway and Lonnie Lowry Sr. alongside Lonnie Jr., his older brother by 5 years. His father lived 10 minutes away from the family's home, which also included Lowry's cousin, Laquita. Lonnie Sr. became estranged from the family when Kyle was about seven years old, leaving him and his siblings to be raised by his mom (who worked at the Internal Revenue Service and the U.S. Post Office) as well as his disciplinarian grandmother (who worked at Dunkin' Donuts). Kyle attributes his survival and well-being to Lonnie Jr. for ensuring that he did not follow in the same path as his childhood friends who are no longer alive, including not allowing Kyle to have any tattoos and piercings. His brother was also instrumental in teaching him how to play basketball, playing pickup basketball together against older boys, and learning not to dwell on his estranged father. His brother also searched newspaper ads for AAU basketball tryouts and ensured that Lowry would get there and make their teams.

== High school career ==
Lowry attended Cardinal Dougherty High School in Philadelphia and played point guard for the school's varsity basketball team.

Considered a five-star recruit by Rivals.com, he was listed as the No. 6 point guard and the No. 28 player in the U.S. in 2004.

== College career ==
In his freshman season at Villanova, Lowry was named to the Big East All-Rookie team and was tabbed Philadelphia Big Five Rookie of the Year. In 24 games (3 starts), he averaged 7.5 points, 3.2 rebounds, 2.0 assists, and 1.3 steals per game.

In his sophomore season, he was named to the All-Big East Second Team, as well as the First Team All-Big 5. In 33 games (31 starts), he averaged 11.0 points, 4.3 rebounds, 3.7 assists, and 2.3 steals per game.

On February 27, 2020, Lowry's jersey no. 1 was retired by the Villanova Wildcats.

== Professional career ==
=== Memphis Grizzlies (2006–2009) ===
Lowry was selected by the Memphis Grizzlies with the 24th overall pick in the 2006 NBA draft. He appeared in 10 games as a rookie before suffering a broken wrist against the Cleveland Cavaliers on November 21, 2006. He subsequently underwent season-ending surgery.

Lowry returned for the 2007–08 season and appeared in all 82 games for the Grizzlies.

The 2008–09 season saw Lowry and good friend Mike Conley Jr. compete for playing time and the starting point guard position. In January 2009, Lionel Hollins was named the team's head coach and Lowry was told that the team would devote the starter's minutes to Conley. Lowry was unhappy with his role, and some in the organization considered him a bad influence on the roster.

=== Houston Rockets (2009–2012) ===
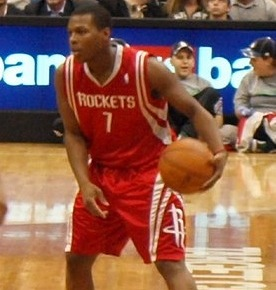
Lowry playing for the Houston Rockets in November 2009

On February 19, 2009, Lowry was traded to the Houston Rockets in a three-team deal involving the Grizzlies and the Orlando Magic. In Houston, Lowry grew to appreciate the tutelage of his new coach, Rick Adelman. With the Rockets making the playoffs in 2009, Lowry played in the postseason for the first time in his career.

In 2009–10, Lowry served as the backup point guard to Aaron Brooks. On December 18, 2009, he recorded a career-high 26 points, 10 assists, six rebounds, and five steals in a 116–108 win over the Dallas Mavericks.

On June 30, 2010, with his contract expiring, the Rockets extended a qualifying offer, thus making Lowry only a restricted free agent. On July 13, 2010, he signed an offer sheet with the Cleveland Cavaliers worth $23.5 million over four years. The Rockets quickly matched the offer, thus retaining Lowry.

In 2010–11, Lowry started in 71 of the 75 games he played in, and his reputation in the league began to solidify. On December 3, he scored a career-high 28 points and matched his career best with 12 assists in the Rockets' 127–111 victory over the Memphis Grizzlies. On December 17, in another win over the Grizzlies, Lowry recorded 17 points and a career-high 18 assists. On January 14, he matched his season high with 28 points in a 110–105 overtime loss to the New Orleans Hornets. On February 16, he scored a career-high 36 points in a 114–105 loss to the Philadelphia 76ers. On March 8, he scored 32 points and made a career-high seven 3-pointers in a 113–110 loss to the Phoenix Suns. On March 20, he recorded his first career triple-double with 28 points, 11 rebounds, and 10 assists in a 110–108 win over the Utah Jazz, becoming only the fourth Rockets player since 2002–03 to record a triple-double. He was subsequently named Western Conference player of the week.

Coach Adelman and the Rockets parted ways following the 2010–11 season, and Lowry initially clashed with new head coach Kevin McHale. In the lockout-shortened 66-game 2011–12 season, Lowry appeared in 47 games with 38 starts, missing 16 games over March and April with a bacterial infection that required hospitalization. With Lowry out, backup point guard Goran Dragić played well in his absence, and the Rockets decided they could trade Lowry to improve their salary cap issues and acquire draft picks during the off-season.

=== Toronto Raptors (2012–2021) ===
==== 2012–13 season: first year in Toronto ====
On July 11, 2012, Lowry was traded to the Toronto Raptors in exchange for Gary Forbes and a future first round pick. Lowry averaged over 23 points and seven assists through the first three games of the season, but was injured during the team's fourth game, a loss to the Oklahoma City Thunder on November 6, 2012. Upon his return he came off the bench behind José Calderón, but regained the starting position when Calderón was traded in a three-team deal on January 30, 2013, that brought Memphis Grizzlies small forward Rudy Gay to the Raptors. Despite the trade, which was meant to help the struggling Raptors return to relevance, the team finished the season with a 34–48 record, missing the playoffs.

On May 31, 2013, Masai Ujiri was hired as the Raptors' new general manager, replacing Bryan Colangelo. Ujiri believed that Lowry had the potential to be a star, but found that his reputation around the NBA had more to do with his history of clashing with coaches and his body language than his talent. Ujiri challenged Lowry during meetings that off-season to be a better player and leader. "Do you want to be a $3 million player, $2 million player for the rest of your career", Ujiri remembers asking Lowry, "...or do you want to be a $10 million player or more?" Lowry also received mentorship from Chauncey Billups, who Lowry remembers "pushed me mentally to challenge myself." Receptive to the advice he had received from Ujiri and others, Lowry looked forward to the upcoming season, entering training camp healthy for the first time in several seasons.

==== 2013–14 season: individual and team improvement ====
The Raptors started the 2013–14 season with a 6–12 record, until Gay, the team's leading scorer, was traded to the Sacramento Kings. Following the trade, Raptors shooting guard DeMar DeRozan approached Lowry and the two decided to take ownership of the team, knowing they could both be traded if the team's management decided to rebuild rather than compete for a playoff spot. Lowry's name was linked to several teams, most frequently the New York Knicks, in trade rumors, but the Knicks were reportedly unwilling to send a first-round pick to Toronto in exchange for Lowry. The post-Gay Raptors quickly emerged as one of the best teams in the Eastern Conference, and many cited Lowry's strong play and leadership as a significant factor in their success. The team finished the season with a franchise-best 48–34 record, third in the Eastern Conference and first in the Atlantic Division for the second time in franchise history. They made the playoffs for the first time since 2008, but lost in the first round to the Brooklyn Nets after Lowry's potential game-winning shot was blocked by Paul Pierce in game 7. Despite the disappointing end to the season, Lowry averaged a career-best 17.9 points, 7.4 assists, and 4.7 rebounds during the regular season and 21.1 points, 4.7 assists, and 4.7 rebounds during the playoffs.

Lowry entered the off-season as one of the NBA's most coveted free agents, attracting interest from the Miami Heat, Houston Rockets, and other teams. On July 10, 2014, he re-signed with the Raptors to a four-year, $48 million contract.

==== 2014–15 season: first All-Star selection ====
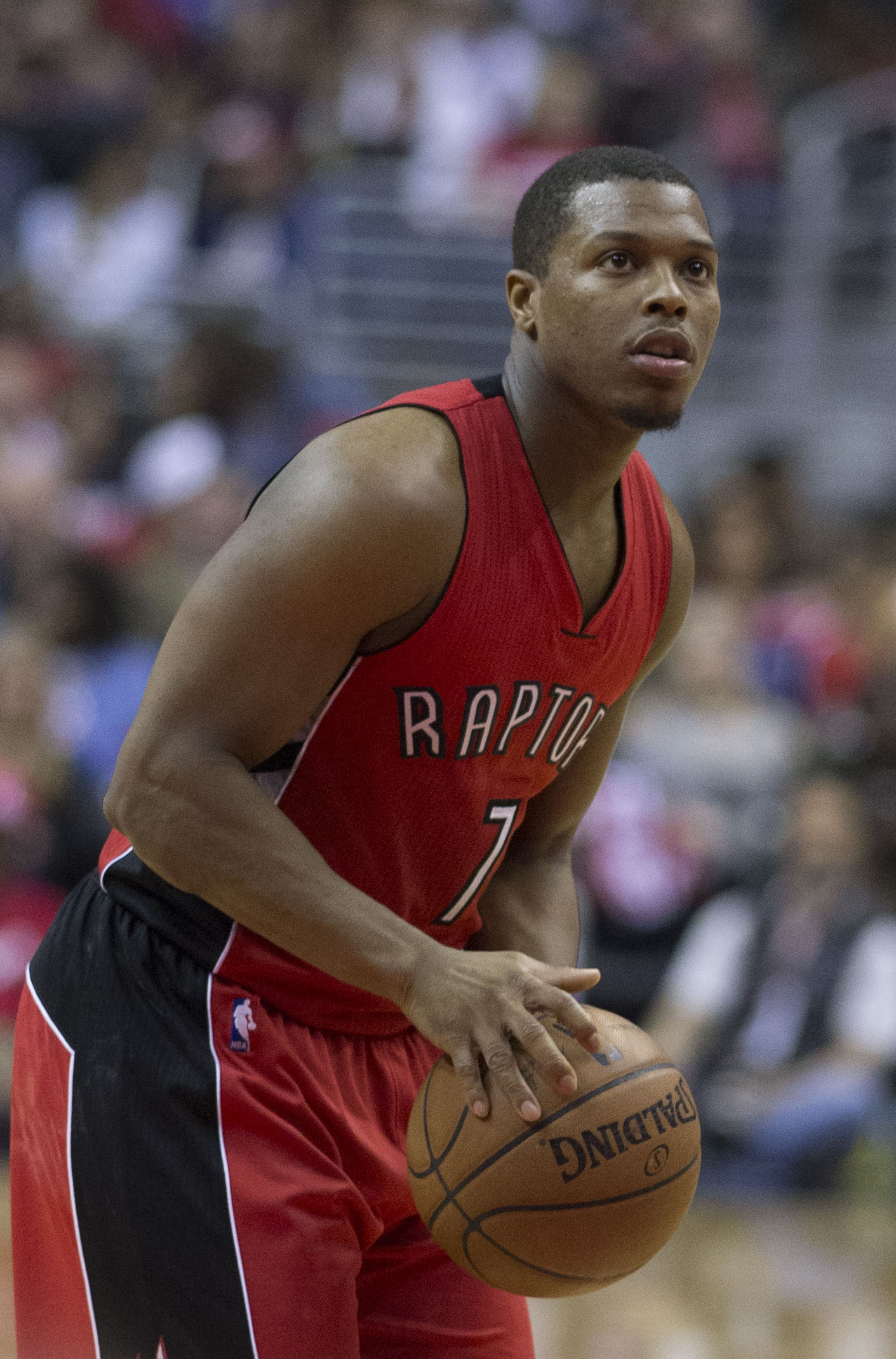
Lowry with the Toronto Raptors in April 2015

The Raptors and Lowry continued their strong play into the next season, and the team once again emerged as a top seed in the Eastern Conference. On November 7, 2014, Lowry became the team's all-time leader for triple-doubles with a 13-point, 10 assist, and 11 rebound performance in a win against the Washington Wizards. It was Lowry's sixth career triple-double and his fourth as a Raptor, passing Damon Stoudamire, who had the previous franchise record of three. On December 3, he scored a career-high 39 points on 13-of-22 shooting in a win against the Utah Jazz. On January 5, 2015, Lowry was named the Eastern Conference player of the month for December 2014, making him only the second Raptor, after Chris Bosh, to receive this recognition. Lowry averaged 22.3 points, 8.9 assists, and 4.2 rebounds during the month, and was named player of the week during the first week and helping lead the Raptors to an 11–4 record. On January 22, 2015, Lowry became a first-time All-Star when he was announced as an Eastern Conference starter in the 2015 NBA All-Star Game. He became only the third Raptor to be voted in as a starter, after Vince Carter and Bosh. On February 5, 2015, the NBA announced that Lowry would also participate in the 2015 NBA All-Star Weekend Skills Challenge as part of the NBA All-Star Weekend. Lowry finished the All-Star game with 10 points, a team-high eight assists, three rebounds and four steals in a loss to the West, completing his first in-game dunk since 2009.

On March 16, 2015, Lowry recorded his seventh career triple-double with 20 points, 11 rebounds, and 10 assists in a 117–98 win over the Indiana Pacers. The Raptors finished the 2014–15 season with a franchise-best 49–33 record, fourth in the East and first in the Atlantic, but were swept in the first round by the Washington Wizards, despite entering the series with homecourt advantage. Lowry averaged 17.8 points, 6.8 assists and 4.7 rebounds in 70 games during the regular season, but a disappointing 12.3 points, as well as 4.8 assists, and 5.5 rebounds, in the playoffs, with many questioning his health during the series.

==== 2015–16 season: All-NBA Third Team ====
Following his disappointing performance in the playoffs, Lowry entered the 2015–16 season with a noticeably slimmer physique, looking "as trim and fit as he ever has during his nearly decade-long NBA career", according to Toronto Sun writer, Ryan Wolstat. Lowry explained that he wanted to be prepared "for 82 games and a long playoff run." On November 3, he scored a game-high 27 points against the Dallas Mavericks as the Raptors started 4–0 for the first time in franchise history (the streak eventually ended with five wins). On December 5, Lowry scored a then career-high 41 points and made six three-pointers in a loss to the Golden State Warriors.

On January 18, 2016, Lowry tied his career-high of made three-pointers in game with seven, scoring a game-high 31 points in total, in a 112–100 win over the Brooklyn Nets. On January 21, he was named as a starter to the Eastern Conference All-Star team for the 2016 NBA All-Star Game. He was also later named a contestant in the Three-Point Contest, making him the third Raptors player to participate in this event. On February 1, in a 112–93 loss to the Denver Nuggets, Lowry passed Alvin Williams for second all-time on the Raptors' assists list. The following day, Lowry and teammate DeMar DeRozan were selected as co-winners for Eastern Conference player of the month for January. The pair helped the Raptors go 12–2 during the month and record a franchise-record 11-game win streak. On February 14, Lowry finished his second All-Star game, held in Toronto for the first time, with 14 points, 10 assists, 5 rebounds, and 2 steals in the East's 196–173 loss to the West. On February 22, he recorded his eighth career triple-double (sixth as a Raptor) with 22 points, 11 assists and 11 rebounds in a 122–95 win over the New York Knicks. Four days later, he scored a career-high 43 points, on 15-of-20 shooting, and had nine assists, five rebounds, and four steals in a 99–97 win over the Cleveland Cavaliers. On February 29, he was named Eastern Conference player of the week for games played from February 22–28. On March 21, he was again named Eastern Conference player of the week, for games played from March 14–20, becoming the first Raptors player since Chris Bosh in 2009–10 to win the award multiple times in the same season. On March 30, he recorded 17 points, 11 assists, and six rebounds in a 105–97 win over the Atlanta Hawks, helping the Raptors reach 50 wins for the first time in franchise history. The team finished the regular season with a 56–26 record, good for first in the Atlantic Division for the third consecutive year, and second in the Eastern Conference.

Lowry entered the playoffs suffering from bursitis in his shooting elbow, as he shot a mere 32% from the field over the final 10 games of the regular season. His poor shooting continued into the postseason as the Raptors faced the Indiana Pacers in the first round. Despite Lowry's struggles, the Raptors defeated the Pacers in seven games, winning their second playoff series in franchise history, their first since 2001, and their first seven-game series. In game 3 of the Raptors' second-round series against the Miami Heat, Lowry broke out of his shooting slump with a 33-point performance on 11-of-19 shooting, helping the Raptors win 95–91 and go up 2–1 on the series. In game 6 of the series, he tied his playoff career high with 36 points on 12-of-27 shooting in a 103–91 loss, as the Heat forced a game 7 in Toronto. In game 7 of the series, he scored 35 points on 11-of-20 shooting, to go along with nine assists, seven rebounds, and four steals, in a 116–89 win, helping the Raptors advance to the Eastern Conference finals for the first time in franchise history. In game 4 of the conference finals against the Cleveland Cavaliers, Lowry scored 35 points on 14-of-20 shooting to help the Raptors win 105–99 and tie the series at 2–2. In game 6 of the series, Lowry again scored 35 points, but was unable to force a game 7, with the 113–87 loss knocking the Raptors out of the playoffs with a 4–2 defeat. Lowry capped off his strong season by earning All-NBA third team honors. With his first selection to the All-NBA team, he joined Vince Carter and Chris Bosh as the only players in franchise history to receive this recognition.

==== 2016–17 season: career high in scoring ====
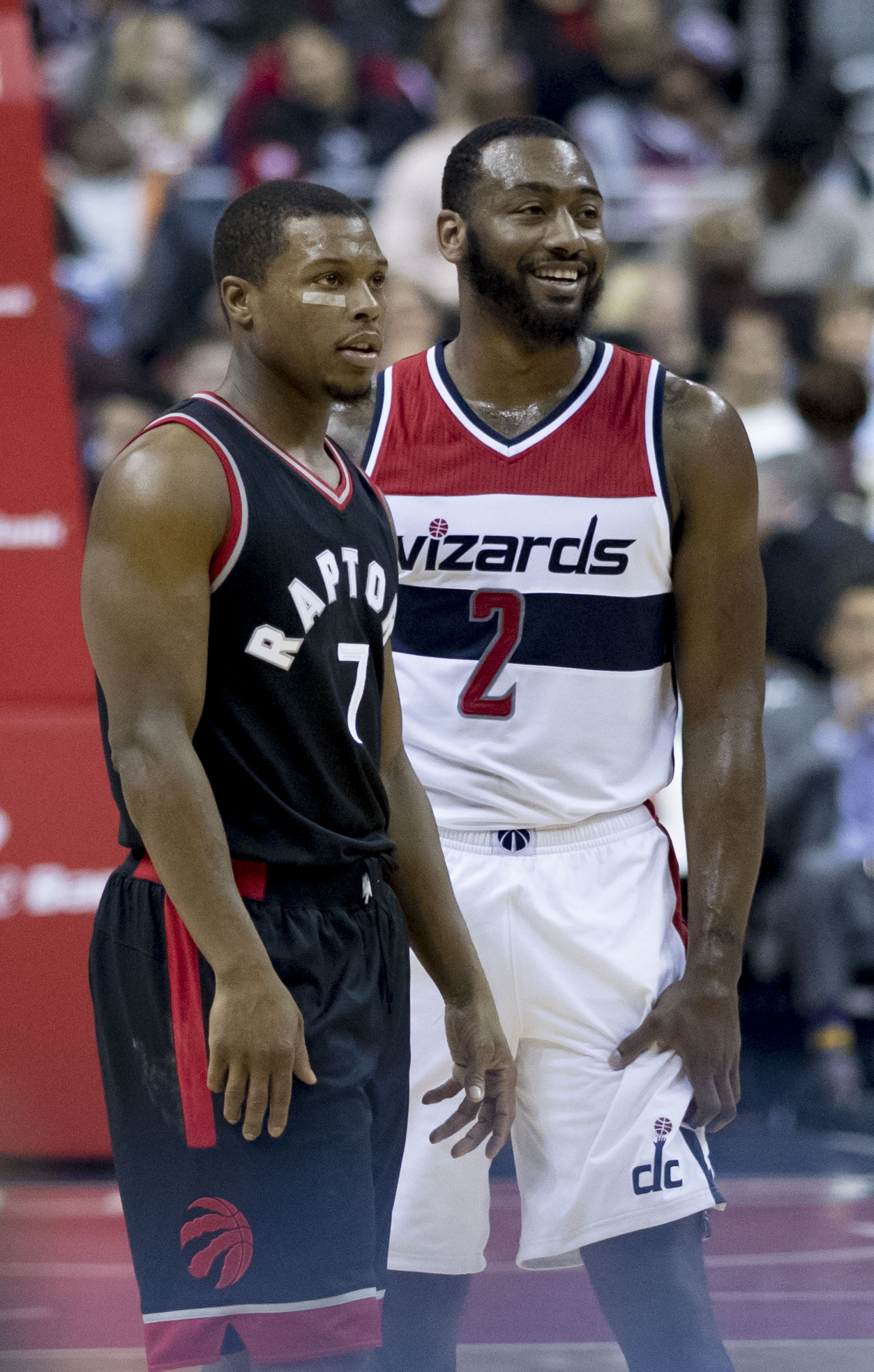
Lowry and John Wall in 2016.

On November 28, 2016, Lowry set a franchise record by hitting all six of his three-pointers for a game-high 24 points in a 122–95 win over the Philadelphia 76ers. On December 9, he scored 21 of his then season-high 34 points in the second half of the Raptors' 101–94 win over the Boston Celtics. He set a new season high on December 23, scoring 36 points, including 19 in the fourth quarter, to lead the Raptors to a 104–98 victory over the Utah Jazz. On January 1, 2017, he scored 20 of his season-high 41 points in the fourth quarter of the Raptors' 123–114 win over the Los Angeles Lakers. He also had 9 rebounds, and 7 assists, and went 5-of-6 from three-point range. On February 5, 2017, he recorded his ninth career triple-double with 15 points, 11 rebounds, and 11 assists in a 103–95 win over the Brooklyn Nets. The following day in the Raptors' 118–109 win over the Los Angeles Clippers, Lowry became the Raptors' franchise leader in three-pointers when he buried one from beyond the arc with 5:27 to play in the first half. His third three-pointer of the night gave him 802 in a Toronto uniform, surpassing Morris Peterson's mark. On April 5, 2017, he returned from an 18-game absence with a wrist injury, played 42 minutes, and had 27 points and 10 assists to help the Raptors overcome a 20-point first-half deficit in a 105–102 victory over the Detroit Pistons.

In the Raptors' second-round playoff series against the Cleveland Cavaliers, Lowry sprained his left ankle in the third quarter of game 2 and aggravated the injury while trying to warm up for game 3. He was not active for game 4 and thus could not assist the Raptors in trying to avoid a series sweep; with a 109–102 loss to the Cavaliers in game 4, the Raptors bowed out of the playoffs with a 4–0 defeat.

Following the playoffs, Lowry declined his $12 million player option for the 2017–18 season and became an unrestricted free agent.

==== 2017–18 season: franchise record in wins ====
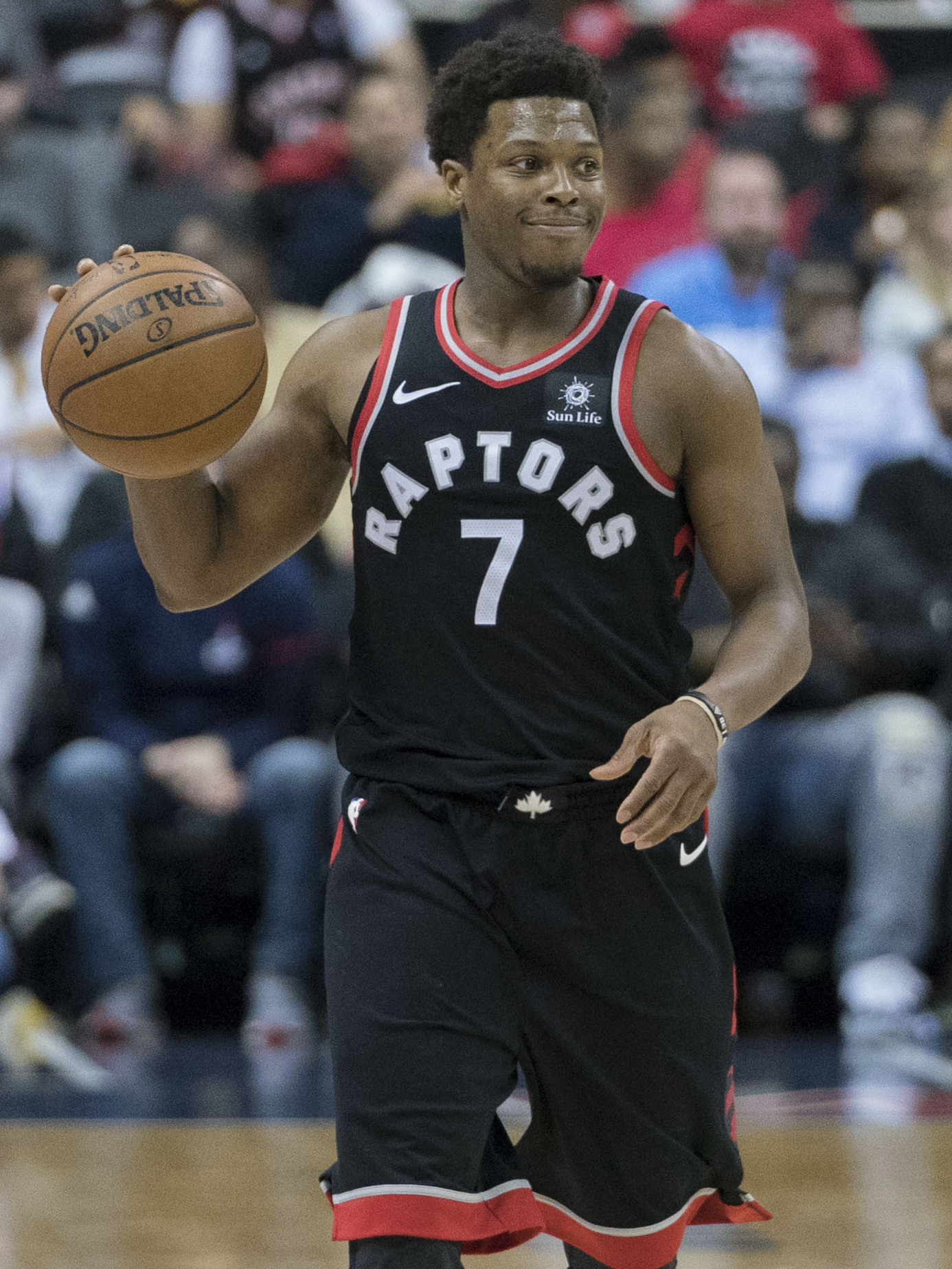
Lowry with the Raptors in 2018

On July 7, 2017, Lowry re-signed with the Raptors to a three-year, $100 million contract. On October 27, 2017, he recorded his first triple-double of the season and his eighth as a Raptor with 11 points, 12 assists, and 10 rebounds in a 101–92 win over the Los Angeles Lakers. With 19 points against the Boston Celtics on November 12, Lowry moved past Andrea Bargnani (6,581 points) into fourth place on Toronto's all-time scoring list. On November 25, he had 15 points, and a career-high 13 rebounds in a 112–78 win over the Atlanta Hawks. Four days later, he scored a season-high 36 points in a 126–113 win over the Charlotte Hornets. On December 15, he recorded his 11th career triple-double, and second of the season, with 10 points, 10 rebounds, and 12 assists in a 120–87 win over the Brooklyn Nets. On January 20, 2018, he scored a season-high 40 points on 14-for-25 shooting, including 6 of 10 from behind the arc, in a 115–109 loss to the Minnesota Timberwolves. Three days later, he was selected as a reserve for the 2018 NBA All-Star Game, marking his fourth consecutive All-Star selection. On February 8, 2018, in a 113–88 win over the New York Knicks, Lowry passed 11,000 career points. On March 23, 2018, he recorded his 10th triple-double as a Raptor with 25 points, 12 assists, and 10 rebounds in a 116–112 win over the Nets.

In game 2 of the Raptors' first-round playoff series against the Washington Wizards, Lowry had 13 points, and a career playoff-high 12 assists, as Toronto took a 2–0 lead in a playoff series for the first time in franchise history with a 130–119 win. In game 6, Lowry scored 24 points in a 102–92 series-clinching win over the Wizards. In the second round, the Raptors were swept for the second straight year by the Cleveland Cavaliers.

==== 2018–19 season: NBA championship ====
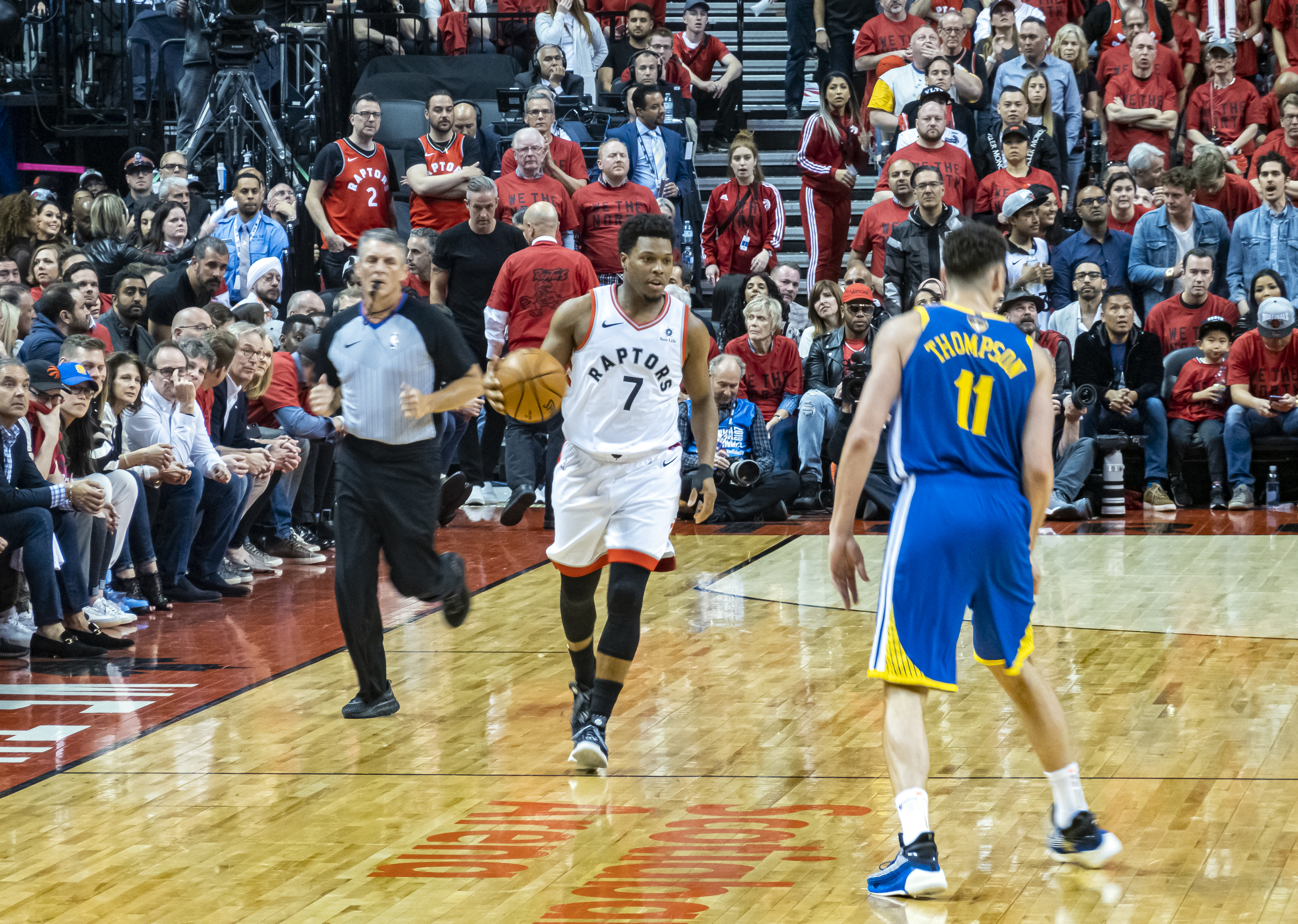
Lowry advances the ball down the court while being guarded by Klay Thompson during game 2 of the 2019 NBA Finals

In the Raptors' season opener on October 17, Lowry scored 27 points on 5-for-6 from 3-point range and had eight assists in a 116–104 win over the Cleveland Cavaliers. On October 26, he had 20 points and 12 assists in a 116–107 win over the Dallas Mavericks, thus recording 10 or more assists for a career-best fourth straight game, becoming the first Raptors player to accomplish the feat since José Calderón had five in a row in March 2012. On October 30, in a 129–112 win over the Philadelphia 76ers, Lowry had 20 points and 13 assists, extending his streak of double-digit assist games to a career-best six. The career-best streak ended at nine. On November 21, he recorded his 13th career triple-double with 21 points, 17 assists, and 12 rebounds in a 124–108 win over the Atlanta Hawks. Lowry missed 10 games between December 14 and January 5 due to a sore left thigh (four games) and a sore lower back (six games). On March 3, he scored a season-high 35 points in a 112–107 overtime loss to the Detroit Pistons. On March 8, he had 13 points, 12 assists, and 11 rebounds in a 127–104 win over the New Orleans Pelicans. In game 1 of the Eastern Conference finals, Lowry scored 30 points and had seven 3-pointers in a 108–100 loss to the Milwaukee Bucks. His seven 3-pointers was a season high, a playoff career high, and one off his career high. In game 5 against Milwaukee, Lowry surpassed DeMar DeRozan (1,117) as the franchise's postseason scoring leader. In game 6, he scored 17 points to help lead the Raptors into the NBA Finals for the first time with a 100–94 victory. In game 6 of the 2019 NBA Finals, Lowry recorded 26 points, 10 assists, and seven rebounds in a 114–110 series-clinching win over the Golden State Warriors, thus helping the Raptors win their first NBA championship in franchise history.

==== 2019–20 season: sixth straight All-Star selection ====
On October 7, 2019, Lowry signed a one-year $31 million extension with the Raptors. On November 2, 2019, Lowry scored a season-high 36 points in a 115–105 loss to the Milwaukee Bucks. On November 8, 2019, Lowry was injured during the 122–102 victory over the New Orleans Pelicans for a sore thumb and sat out for two weeks missing 12 games. On December 3, 2019, he made his return against the Miami Heat. He scored 12 points along with 6 rebounds, 11 assists, 1 steal and 1 block in a 121–110 loss. On December 22, 2019, Lowry scored 20 of his game-high 32 points in the fourth quarter in a 110–107 victory against the Dallas Mavericks, helping the Raptors overcome a 30-point deficit, making it their biggest comeback victory in franchise history and the first 30-point comeback win in ten years. On December 23, 2019, Lowry was named Eastern Conference player of the week for games played between December 16–22. On August 1, 2020, Lowry scored 33 points, along with a career-high 14 rebounds, while leading the Raptors to a 107–93 win over the Los Angeles Lakers. This was the Raptors first game in the Orlando bubble, returning from a four-month hiatus due to the COVID-19 pandemic. The Raptors were unable to defend their title as they were eliminated in seven games by the Boston Celtics in the second round.

==== 2020–21 season: final year in Toronto ====
On January 14, 2021, after getting 16 points, six rebounds, and a season-high 12 assists in a 111–108 win against the Charlotte Hornets, Lowry recorded his 4,000th assist with the Raptors, joining Stephen Curry and Damian Lillard as the only players who have over 4,000 assists with their current teams. On January 27, 2021, after a quick three-pointer against the Milwaukee Bucks, Lowry reached 10,000 points with the Raptors, joining Chris Bosh and DeMar DeRozan as the only players to reach that milestone with the franchise. He had 21 points, five rebounds and three assists in a 115–108 loss. On January 31, 2021, Lowry had 12 points, six rebounds, and a season-high 15 assists in a 115–102 win against the Orlando Magic. On February 2, 2021, Lowry had his first triple-double of the season, getting 14 points, 10 rebounds, and 10 assists in a 123–108 win against the Magic. On February 5, 2021, Lowry scored a season-high 30 points with five rebounds, seven assists and two steals in a 123–117 win against the Brooklyn Nets. On February 26, 2021, Lowry had his second triple-double of the season with 20 points, 11 rebounds and 10 assists in a 122–111 win against the Houston Rockets. On March 4, 2021, Lowry had a career-high 19 assists in a 132–125 loss against the Boston Celtics. On May 2, 2021, Lowry scored a new season-high 37 points and made a career-high tying eight three-pointers with two rebounds, 11 assists and a steal in a 121–114 win against the Los Angeles Lakers.

=== Miami Heat (2021–2024) ===
On August 6, 2021, the Miami Heat signed Lowry on a three-year, $85 million contract via a sign-and-trade with the Raptors in exchange for former teammate Goran Dragić and Precious Achiuwa. On November 6, 2021, Lowry recorded his first triple double with the Heat and his 19th career triple double in a 118–115 win over the Utah Jazz with a statline of 20 points, 12 rebounds and 10 assists while shooting 72% from the field. On Dec. 19, 2021, Lowry drew the 252nd charge of his career, passing Ersan Ilyasova and making him the NBA's charges drawn leader for the play-by-play era (going back to the 2000–01 season when this stat was first trackable). He finished the season with a total of 259 charges drawn. Lowry led the Heat to the top seed in the Eastern Conference with a 53–29 record. During the Heat's 2022 playoff run, Lowry missed multiple games due to a hamstring injury. On May 27, in game 6 of the Eastern Conference finals, Lowry recorded a double-double of 18 points and 10 assists in a 111–103 win over the Boston Celtics. In the decisive game 7, the Heat were eliminated in a 100–96 loss.

On April 11, 2023, during the Heat's play-in tournament game against the Atlanta Hawks, Lowry scored a season-high 33 points, alongside four rebounds and five assists, in a 116–105 loss. However, the Heat defeated the Chicago Bulls in a 102–91 win three days later to secure the eighth seed in the playoffs. In the NBA Finals, the Heat lost in five games to the Denver Nuggets.

On January 23, 2024, Lowry was traded to the Charlotte Hornets, alongside a first-round draft pick, in exchange for Terry Rozier. Lowry's contract was subsequently bought out on February 11.

=== Philadelphia 76ers (2024–2026) ===
On February 13, 2024, Lowry signed with the Philadelphia 76ers for the remainder of the season. Nine days later, he made his 76ers debut, putting up 11 points, five assists, and four rebounds in a 110–96 loss to the New York Knicks.

On July 12, 2024, Lowry re-signed with the 76ers on a minimum. He made 35 appearances (12 starts) for Philadelphia during the 2024–25 NBA season, averaging 3.9 points, 1.9 rebounds, and 2.7 assists.

On July 7, 2025, Lowry re-signed with Philadelphia on a minimum for a second consecutive year. He appeared in only 14 regular season games during the 2025–26 NBA season, with averages of 1.2 points and 0.8 assists.

On July 7, 2026, Lowry announced his retirement and also signed a ceremonial one-day contract with the Toronto Raptors to officially retire with the team where he spent most of his NBA career.

== National team career ==
Lowry was a member of the U.S. men's national team that won gold at the 2016 Summer Olympics, during which he averaged 5 points and 3.3 rebounds. His best scoring performance was in the semifinal game against Spain with 9 points. He earned praise for his defense and leadership during the tournament, with head coach Mike Krzyzewski calling him the team's "unsung hero" and assistant coach Jim Boeheim naming him "the best team player out of everybody.". In the gold medal game, Lowry collected five rebounds, five assists and scored five points being the team leader and all around general.

== Player profile ==
Lowry's tenacious playing style, combined with his stocky physique, often earned him comparisons to a pit bull or bulldog, with many citing his toughness, leadership, and instinct for winning plays on the court. Lowry's Villanova teammate Curtis Sumpter remembers "he was just so tough. He wasn't the flashy guy. He wasn't coming down to try and throw 150 crossovers and make all these fantastic moves. That wasn't his game. He was just so solid and able to read the defenses and make the pass at the right time and get guys in the right position to score." In 2014, Zach Lowe of Grantland wrote that Lowry "was probably the best point guard in the Eastern Conference from start to finish [of the 2013–14 season], raining off-the-bounce 3s, getting Toronto into its offense, toning down the wild gambles on defense, and using that stubby little body to draw more charges than anyone."

Lowry was considered a strong rebounder for his position, as well as an elite defender. He holds the Toronto Raptors' franchise record for triple-doubles, as well as the most made three-point field goals in a season, for the 2013–14 season.

== Awards and achievements ==
=== College ===
- Second-team All-Big East: 2006
- Big East All-Freshman Team: 2005
- No. 1 retired by Villanova Wildcats: February 27, 2020

=== NBA ===
- NBA champion: 2019
- All-NBA Third Team: 2016
- NBA All-Star: 2015, 2016, 2017, 2018, 2019, 2020
- All-time leader in charges drawn
- NBA Eastern Conference player of the month: December 2014; January 2016
- NBA Eastern Conference player of the week: January 27 – February 2, 2014; December 1–7, 2014; February 22–28, 2016; March 14–20, 2016; December 16–22, 2019
- NBA Western Conference player of the week: March 14–20, 2011

==== Toronto Raptors ====
- All-time leader in assists
- All-time leader in triple-doubles: 16 – Lowry has 16 of the 30 triple-doubles in Raptors history
- All-time leader in steals
- All-time leader in three-point field goals

=== U.S. men's national team ===
- Olympic gold medalist: 2016 Summer Olympics

=== Other achievements and honors ===
- George Gross/Toronto Sun Sportsman of the Year award: December 25, 2014
- Honorary Doctor of Humanities degree from Acadia University: May 9, 2021.
- Toronto Mayor John Tory proclaimed April 3, 2022 as "Kyle Lowry Day" in the city of Toronto.
- A street in Toronto, "Kyle Lowry Road", named in his honour on June 13, 2022; located at a new development on the northeast corner of Don Mills Road & Eglinton Avenue East.

== Career statistics ==
Legend
| GP | Games played | GS | Games started | MPG | Minutes per game |
| FG% | Field goal percentage | 3P% | 3-point field goal percentage | FT% | Free throw percentage |
| RPG | Rebounds per game | APG | Assists per game | SPG | Steals per game |
| BPG | Blocks per game | PPG | Points per game | **Bold** | Career high |
| † | Won an NBA championship | * | Led the league |

=== NBA ===
==== Regular season ====
| Year | Team | GP | GS | MPG | FG% | 3P% | FT% | RPG | APG | SPG | BPG | PPG |
|---|---|---|---|---|---|---|---|---|---|---|---|---|
| 2006–07 | Memphis | 10 | 0 | 17.5 | .368 | .375 | **.893** | 3.1 | 3.2 | 1.4 | .1 | 5.6 |
| 2007–08 | Memphis | **82*** | 9 | 25.5 | .432 | .257 | .698 | 3.0 | 3.6 | 1.1 | .3 | 9.6 |
| 2008–09 | Memphis | 49 | 21 | 21.9 | .412 | .246 | .801 | 2.3 | 3.6 | 1.0 | .2 | 7.6 |
| 2008–09 | Houston | 28 | 0 | 21.7 | **.475** | .276 | .800 | 2.8 | 3.5 | .8 | .3 | 7.6 |
| 2009–10 | Houston | 68 | 0 | 24.3 | .397 | .272 | .827 | 3.6 | 4.5 | .9 | .1 | 9.1 |
| 2010–11 | Houston | 75 | 71 | 34.2 | .426 | .376 | .765 | 4.1 | 6.7 | 1.4 | .3 | 13.5 |
| 2011–12 | Houston | 47 | 38 | 32.1 | .409 | .374 | .864 | 4.5 | 6.6 | 1.6 | .3 | 14.3 |
| 2012–13 | Toronto | 68 | 52 | 29.7 | .401 | .362 | .795 | 4.7 | 6.4 | 1.4 | .4 | 11.6 |
| 2013–14 | Toronto | 79 | **79** | 36.2 | .423 | .380 | .813 | 4.7 | 7.4 | 1.5 | .2 | 17.9 |
| 2014–15 | Toronto | 70 | 70 | 34.5 | .412 | .338 | .808 | 4.7 | 6.8 | 1.6 | .2 | 17.8 |
| 2015–16 | Toronto | 77 | 77 | 37.0 | .427 | .388 | .811 | 4.7 | 6.4 | **2.1** | .4 | 21.2 |
| 2016–17 | Toronto | 60 | 60 | **37.4** | .464 | **.412** | .819 | 4.8 | 7.0 | 1.5 | .3 | **22.4** |
| 2017–18 | Toronto | 78 | 78 | 32.2 | .427 | .399 | .854 | **5.6** | 6.9 | 1.1 | .2 | 16.2 |
| 2018–19† | Toronto | 65 | 65 | 34.1 | .411 | .347 | .830 | 4.8 | **8.7** | 1.4 | **.5** | 14.2 |
| 2019–20 | Toronto | 58 | 58 | 36.2 | .416 | .352 | .857 | 5.0 | 7.5 | 1.4 | .4 | 19.4 |
| 2020–21 | Toronto | 46 | 46 | 34.8 | .436 | .396 | .875 | 5.4 | 7.3 | 1.0 | .3 | 17.2 |
| 2021–22 | Miami | 63 | 63 | 33.9 | .440 | .377 | .851 | 4.5 | 7.5 | 1.1 | .3 | 13.4 |
| 2022–23 | Miami | 55 | 44 | 31.2 | .404 | .345 | .859 | 4.1 | 5.1 | 1.0 | .4 | 11.2 |
| 2023–24 | Miami | 37 | 35 | 28.0 | .426 | .385 | .833 | 3.5 | 4.0 | 1.1 | .4 | 8.2 |
| 2023–24 | Philadelphia | 23 | 20 | 28.4 | .444 | .404 | .848 | 2.8 | 4.6 | .9 | .3 | 8.0 |
| 2024–25 | Philadelphia | 35 | 12 | 18.8 | .350 | .330 | .818 | 1.9 | 2.7 | .9 | .3 | 3.9 |
| 2025–26 | Philadelphia | 14 | 0 | 8.4 | .160 | .160 | .833 | .6 | .8 | .1 | .1 | 1.2 |
| Career | | 1,187 | 898 | 31.0 | .423 | .367 | .815 | 4.2 | 6.0 | 1.3 | .3 | 13.8 |
| All-Star | | 6 | 2 | 22.4 | .354 | .271 | 1.000 | 4.3 | 6.7 | 2.3 | .2 | 10.5 |

==== Playoffs ====
| Year | Team | GP | GS | MPG | FG% | 3P% | FT% | RPG | APG | SPG | BPG | PPG |
|---|---|---|---|---|---|---|---|---|---|---|---|---|
| 2009 | Houston | 13 | 0 | 19.5 | .333 | .250 | .742 | 2.9 | 2.5 | .9 | .1 | 5.3 |
| 2014 | Toronto | 7 | 7 | **38.8** | .404 | .395 | .878 | 4.7 | 4.7 | .9 | .0 | **21.1** |
| 2015 | Toronto | 4 | 4 | 32.8 | .316 | .217 | .727 | 5.5 | 4.8 | 1.3 | .0 | 12.3 |
| 2016 | Toronto | 20 | 20 | 38.3 | .397 | .304 | .750 | 4.7 | 6.0 | 1.6 | .2 | 19.1 |
| 2017 | Toronto | 8 | 8 | 37.6 | .462 | .342 | .818 | 3.1 | 5.9 | 1.5 | .5 | 15.8 |
| 2018 | Toronto | 10 | 10 | 36.1 | **.508** | **.444** | .813 | 4.3 | **8.5** | 1.5 | .0 | 17.4 |
| 2019† | Toronto | **24** | **24** | 37.5 | .440 | .359 | .802 | 4.9 | 6.6 | 1.3 | .3 | 15.0 |
| 2020 | Toronto | 11 | 11 | 37.6 | .419 | .319 | .800 | **6.5** | 5.8 | **1.7** | **.7** | 17.7 |
| 2022 | Miami | 10 | 10 | 29.5 | .291 | .241 | .789 | 3.6 | 4.7 | 1.2 | **.7** | 7.8 |
| 2023 | Miami | 23 | 1 | 26.1 | .425 | .375 | **.939** | 3.5 | 4.4 | 1.0 | .6 | 9.2 |
| 2024 | Philadelphia | 6 | 6 | 29.2 | .344 | .333 | .800 | 3.5 | 4.0 | 1.0 | **.7** | 7.0 |
| 2026 | Philadelphia | 2 | 0 | 1.5 | — | — | — | .5 | .0 | .0 | .0 | .0 |
| Career | | 138 | 101 | 32.4 | .411 | .338 | .803 | 4.2 | 5.3 | 1.3 | .3 | 13.3 |

=== College ===
| Year | Team | GP | GS | MPG | FG% | 3P% | FT% | RPG | APG | SPG | BPG | PPG |
|---|---|---|---|---|---|---|---|---|---|---|---|---|
| 2004–05 | Villanova | 24 | 3 | 23.2 | .421 | .227 | .635 | 3.2 | 2.0 | 1.3 | **.2** | 7.5 |
| 2005–06 | Villanova | **33** | **31** | **29.3** | **.466** | **.444** | **.786** | **4.3** | **3.7** | **2.3** | **.2** | **11.0** |
| Career | | 57 | 34 | 26.7 | .449 | .325 | .737 | 3.8 | 3.0 | 1.9 | .2 | 9.5 |

== Personal life ==
Lowry is married to Ayahna Cornish (2012), a fellow Philadelphia native. The couple met while attending Cardinal Dougherty High School together, where she too was a varsity basketball player. Cornish later played at Saint Joseph's University, where she was also named the best offensive player for two consecutive seasons. However, she suffered an ACL injury her junior year. The couple has two sons: Karter (born August 18, 2011) and Kameron (born July 15, 2015).

In 2025, Lowry participated in the third Creator Classic, a golf event organized by the PGA Tour centered around golf influencers.

On September 25, 2025, Amazon Prime Video hired Lowry to serve as an analyst, signing him to a multi-year contract.

On July 7, 2026, Lowry and his wife Ayahna joined the Tempo as minority owners the same day Lowry officially retired.

== See also ==
- List of NBA career turnovers leaders
- List of NBA career 3-point scoring leaders
- List of NBA career triple-double leaders
- List of NBA seasons played leaders
- List of NBA career playoff 3-point scoring leaders
- List of oldest and youngest NBA players
