= 2021–22 Miami Heat season =

- Division champions
- Head coach: Erik Spoelstra
- President: Pat Riley
- General manager: Andy Elisburg
- Owner: Micky Arison
- Arena: FTX Arena

Results
- Record: 53–29 (.646)
- Place: Division: 1st (Southeast); Conference: 1st (Eastern)
- Playoff finish: Conference finals (lost to Celtics 3–4)
- Stats at Basketball Reference

Local media
- Television: Bally Sports Sun
- Radio: 790 AM, "The Ticket"

The 2021–22 Miami Heat season was the 34th season of the franchise in the National Basketball Association (NBA). The Heat looked to improve after the previous season's first-round exit sweep against the eventual champion Milwaukee Bucks. For the first time since 2019, Andre Iguodala was not on the roster as he returned to the Golden State Warriors.

On August 6, 2021, the Miami Heat acquired Kyle Lowry from the Raptors via a sign-and-trade in exchange for Goran Dragić and Precious Achiuwa. On November 6, 2021, Lowry recorded his first triple double with the Heat and his 19th career triple double in a 118–115 win over the Utah Jazz with a statline of 20 points, 12 rebounds and 10 assist while shooting 72% from the field.

During the 2022 playoff run, Lowry missed multiple games due to a hamstring injury. On May 27, in Game 6 of the Eastern Conference finals, Lowry recorded a double-double of 18 points and 10 assists in a 111–103 win over the Boston Celtics.

On March 18, with a win over the Oklahoma City Thunder, the Heat won the Southeast Division. On April 7, for only the fourth time in their history, they also clinched the No.1 Seed in the Eastern Conference.

The Heat defeated the Atlanta Hawks in the first round in five games, then defeated the Philadelphia 76ers in the second round in six games and faced the Boston Celtics in the Eastern Conference finals where they lost at home in a seven-game series. This is the first time that the Heat were eliminated in the conference finals since 2005.

This is Miami's first and only season where they played every home game in the newly renamed FTX Arena, as it would later be renamed midway through the next season following the Bankruptcy of FTX.

== Draft picks ==
Miami did not carry any draft picks for the 2021 NBA draft as they had traded away their two original selections.

== Roster ==
2021–22 Miami Heat roster
Players

| Pos. | No. | Player | Height | Weight | DOB | From |
|---|---|---|---|---|---|---|
| F/C | 13 | Bam Adebayo | 6 ft 10 in (2.08 m) | 255 lb (116 kg) | 1997-07-18 | Kentucky |
| F | 22 | Jimmy Butler | 6 ft 8 in (2.03 m) | 230 lb (104 kg) | 1989-09-14 | Marquette |
| C | 21 | Dewayne Dedmon | 7 ft 0 in (2.13 m) | 245 lb (111 kg) | 1989 | USC |
| F | 40 | Udonis Haslem | 6 ft 8 in (2.03 m) | 235 lb (107 kg) | 1980-06-09 | Florida |
| G | 14 | Tyler Herro | 6 ft 5 in (1.96 m) | 195 lb (88 kg) | 2000-01-20 | Kentucky |
| F | 24 | Haywood Highsmith | 6 ft 5 in (1.96 m) | 220 lb (100 kg) | 1996-12-09 | Wheeling |
| G | 7 | Kyle Lowry | 6 ft 0 in (1.83 m) | 196 lb (89 kg) | 1986-03-25 | Villanova |
| G/F | 16 | Caleb Martin | 6 ft 5 in (1.96 m) | 205 lb (93 kg) | 1995-09-28 | Nevada |
| F | 8 | Markieff Morris | 6 ft 10 in (2.08 m) | 245 lb (111 kg) | 1989-09-02 | Kansas |
| G | 12 | Mychal Mulder (TW) | 6 ft 3 in (1.91 m) | 195 lb (88 kg) | 1994-06-12 | Kentucky |
| G | 4 | Victor Oladipo | 6 ft 4 in (1.93 m) | 213 lb (97 kg) | 1992-05-04 | Indiana |
| G | 55 | Duncan Robinson | 6 ft 7 in (2.01 m) | 215 lb (98 kg) | 1994-04-22 | Michigan |
| G | 15 | Javonte Smart (TW) | 6 ft 4 in (1.93 m) | 205 lb (93 kg) | 1999-06-03 | LSU |
| G/F | 31 | Max Strus | 6 ft 5 in (1.96 m) | 215 lb (98 kg) | 1996-03-28 | DePaul |
| F | 17 | P. J. Tucker | 6 ft 6 in (1.98 m) | 245 lb (111 kg) | 1985-05-05 | Texas |
| G | 2 | Gabe Vincent | 6 ft 3 in (1.91 m) | 200 lb (91 kg) | 1996-06-14 | UC Santa Barbara |
| C | 77 | Ömer Yurtseven | 7 ft 0 in (2.13 m) | 275 lb (125 kg) | 1998-06-19 | Georgetown |

Coaches
Head coach
- Erik Spoelstra
Assistant(s)
- Malik Allen
- Caron Butler
- Octavio De La Grana
- Chris Quinn

Legend
- (DP) Unsigned draft pick
- (FA) Free agent
- (S) Suspended
- (GL) On assignment to G League affiliate
- (TW) Two-way affiliate player
- Injured

Roster
Updated: March 24, 2022

== Standings ==
=== Division ===
| Southeast Division | W | L | PCT | GB | Home | Road | Div | GP |
|---|---|---|---|---|---|---|---|---|
| c – Miami Heat | 53 | 29 | .646 | – | 29‍–‍12 | 24‍–‍17 | 13–3 | 82 |
| x − Atlanta Hawks | 43 | 39 | .524 | 10.0 | 27‍–‍14 | 16‍–‍25 | 9–7 | 82 |
| pi − Charlotte Hornets | 43 | 39 | .524 | 10.0 | 22‍–‍19 | 21‍–‍20 | 8–8 | 82 |
| Washington Wizards | 35 | 47 | .427 | 18.0 | 21‍–‍20 | 14‍–‍27 | 7–9 | 82 |
| Orlando Magic | 22 | 60 | .268 | 31.0 | 12‍–‍29 | 10‍–‍31 | 3–13 | 82 |

=== Conference ===
Eastern Conference
| # | Team | W | L | PCT | GB | GP |
|---|---|---|---|---|---|---|
| 1 | c – Miami Heat * | 53 | 29 | .646 | – | 82 |
| 2 | y – Boston Celtics * | 51 | 31 | .622 | 2.0 | 82 |
| 3 | y – Milwaukee Bucks * | 51 | 31 | .622 | 2.0 | 82 |
| 4 | x – Philadelphia 76ers | 51 | 31 | .622 | 2.0 | 82 |
| 5 | x – Toronto Raptors | 48 | 34 | .585 | 5.0 | 82 |
| 6 | x – Chicago Bulls | 46 | 36 | .561 | 7.0 | 82 |
| 7 | x − Brooklyn Nets | 44 | 38 | .537 | 9.0 | 82 |
| 8 | pi − Cleveland Cavaliers | 44 | 38 | .537 | 9.0 | 82 |
| 9 | x − Atlanta Hawks | 43 | 39 | .524 | 10.0 | 82 |
| 10 | pi − Charlotte Hornets | 43 | 39 | .524 | 10.0 | 82 |
| 11 | New York Knicks | 37 | 45 | .451 | 16.0 | 82 |
| 12 | Washington Wizards | 35 | 47 | .427 | 18.0 | 82 |
| 13 | Indiana Pacers | 25 | 57 | .305 | 28.0 | 82 |
| 14 | Detroit Pistons | 23 | 59 | .280 | 30.0 | 82 |
| 15 | Orlando Magic | 22 | 60 | .268 | 31.0 | 82 |

== Game log ==
=== Preseason ===
2021 preseason game log
Total: 5–1 (home: 3–0; road: 2–1)
Preseason: 5–1 (home: 3–0; road: 2–1)

| Game | Date | Team | Score | High points | High rebounds | High assists | Location Attendance | Record |
|---|---|---|---|---|---|---|---|---|
| 1 | October 4 | Atlanta | W 125–99 | Tyler Herro (26) | Omer Yurtseven (8) | Lowry, Vincent (7) | FTX Arena; 19,600 | 1–0 |
| 2 | October 7 | @ Houston | W 113–106 | Tyler Herro (24) | Tyler Herro (9) | Kyle Lowry (10) | Toyota Center; 10,491 | 2–0 |
| 3 | October 8 | @ San Antonio | W 109–105 | Max Strus (28) | Micah Potter (17) | Javonte Smart (5) | AT&T Center; 15,160 | 3–0 |
| 4 | October 11 | Charlotte | W 104–103 | Bam Adebayo (18) | Omer Yurtseven (8) | Garrett, Lowry (5) | FTX Arena; 19,600 | 4–0 |
| 5 | October 14 | @ Atlanta | L 92–127 | Javonte Smart (20) | Micah Potter (16) | Gabe Vincent (10) | State Farm Arena; 12,527 | 4–1 |
| 6 | October 15 | Boston | W 121–100 | Tyler Herro (29) | Bam Adebayo (7) | Butler, Herro (4) | FTX Arena; 19,600 | 5–1 |

2021–22 season schedule

=== Regular season ===
2021–22 game log
Total: 53–29 (home: 29–12; road: 24–17)
October: 5–1 (home: 3–0; road: 2–1)

| Game | Date | Team | Score | High points | High rebounds | High assists | Location Attendance | Record |
|---|---|---|---|---|---|---|---|---|
| 1 | October 21 | Milwaukee | W 137–95 | Tyler Herro (27) | Bam Adebayo (13) | Kyle Lowry (6) | FTX Arena; 19,600 | 1–0 |
| 2 | October 23 | @ Indiana | L 91–102 | Tyler Herro (30) | Bam Adebayo (16) | Jimmy Butler (6) | Gainbridge Fieldhouse; 17,147 | 1–1 |
| 3 | October 25 | Orlando | W 107–90 | Jimmy Butler (36) | Bam Adebayo (13) | Tyler Herro (9) | FTX Arena; 19,600 | 2–1 |
| 4 | October 27 | @ Brooklyn | W 106–93 | Bam Adebayo (24) | Jimmy Butler (14) | Jimmy Butler (7) | Barclays Center; 17,732 | 3–1 |
| 5 | October 29 | Charlotte | W 114–99 | Jimmy Butler (32) | Bam Adebayo (19) | Tyler Herro (6) | FTX Arena; 19,600 | 4–1 |
| 6 | October 30 | @ Memphis | W 129–103 | Tyler Herro (22) | Dewayne Dedmon (9) | Kyle Lowry (8) | FedExForum; 15,989 | 5–1 |

November: 8–7 (home: 3–2; road: 5–5)

| Game | Date | Team | Score | High points | High rebounds | High assists | Location Attendance | Record |
|---|---|---|---|---|---|---|---|---|
| 7 | November 2 | @ Dallas | W 125–110 | Jimmy Butler (23) | Bam Adebayo (13) | Kyle Lowry (9) | American Airlines Center; 19,255 | 6–1 |
| 8 | November 4 | Boston | L 78–95 | Jimmy Butler (20) | Tucker, Adebayo, Lowry, Herro (7) | Kyle Lowry (5) | FTX Arena; 19,600 | 6–2 |
| 9 | November 6 | Utah | W 118–115 | Tyler Herro (29) | Kyle Lowry (12) | Kyle Lowry (10) | FTX Arena; 19,600 | 7–2 |
| 10 | November 8 | @ Denver | L 96–113 | Jimmy Butler (31) | Bam Adebayo (10) | Jimmy Butler (8) | Ball Arena; 15,577 | 7–3 |
| 11 | November 10 | @ L.A. Lakers | L 117–120 (OT) | Bam Adebayo (28) | P. J. Tucker (13) | Kyle Lowry (11) | Staples Center; 18,997 | 7–4 |
| 12 | November 11 | @ L.A. Clippers | L 109–112 | Bam Adebayo (30) | Bam Adebayo (11) | Gabe Vincent (6) | Staples Center; 16,150 | 7–5 |
| 13 | November 13 | @ Utah | W 111–105 | Tyler Herro (27) | P. J. Tucker (11) | Bam Adebayo (7) | Vivint Arena; 18,306 | 8–5 |
| 14 | November 15 | @ Oklahoma City | W 103–90 | Tyler Herro (26) | Dedmon, Herro, Okpala (7) | Kyle Lowry (11) | Paycom Center; 12,330 | 9–5 |
| 15 | November 17 | New Orleans | W 113–98 | Jimmy Butler (31) | Jimmy Butler (10) | Jimmy Butler (10) | FTX Arena; 19,600 | 10–5 |
| 16 | November 18 | Washington | W 112–97 | Jimmy Butler (32) | Bam Adebayo (9) | Jimmy Butler (4) | FTX Arena; 19,600 | 11–5 |
| 17 | November 20 | @ Washington | L 100–103 | Jimmy Butler (29) | Bam Adebayo (6) | Kyle Lowry (7) | Capital One Arena; 20,476 | 11–6 |
| 18 | November 23 | @ Detroit | W 100–92 | Tyler Herro (31) | Adebayo, Butler (9) | Kyle Lowry (8) | Little Caesars Arena; 13,123 | 12–6 |
| 19 | November 24 | @ Minnesota | L 101–113 | Bam Adebayo (18) | Jimmy Butler (8) | Butler, Lowry (5) | Target Center; 17,136 | 12–7 |
| 20 | November 27 | @ Chicago | W 107–104 | Gabe Vincent (20) | Bam Adebayo (17) | Adebayo, Lowry (6) | United Center; 21,110 | 13–7 |
| 21 | November 29 | Denver | L 111–120 | Bam Adebayo (24) | Bam Adebayo (13) | Kyle Lowry (14) | FTX Arena; 19,600 | 13–8 |

December: 10–5 (home: 6–2; road: 4–3)

| Game | Date | Team | Score | High points | High rebounds | High assists | Location Attendance | Record |
|---|---|---|---|---|---|---|---|---|
| 22 | December 1 | Cleveland | W 111–85 | Tyler Herro (21) | Dewayne Dedmon (13) | Tyler Herro (6) | FTX Arena; 19,600 | 13–9 |
| 23 | December 3 | @ Indiana | W 113–104 | Kyle Lowry (26) | Dedmon, Tucker (6) | Kyle Lowry (9) | Gainbridge Fieldhouse; 13,854 | 14–9 |
| 24 | December 4 | @ Milwaukee | L 102–124 | Tyler Herro (14) | Dewayne Dedmon (13) | Kyle Lowry (7) | Fiserv Forum; 17,341 | 14–10 |
| 25 | December 6 | Memphis | L 90–105 | Tyler Herro (24) | Dewayne Dedmon (6) | Kyle Lowry (8) | FTX Arena; 19,600 | 14–11 |
| 26 | December 8 | Milwaukee | W 113–104 | Caleb Martin (28) | Dedmon, Okpala (9) | Kyle Lowry (13) | FTX Arena; 19,600 | 15–11 |
| 27 | December 11 | Chicago | W 118–92 | Duncan Robinson (26) | Dewayne Dedmon (12) | Kyle Lowry (14) | FTX Arena; 19,731 | 16–11 |
| 28 | December 13 | @ Cleveland | L 94–105 | P. J. Tucker (23) | P. J. Tucker (9) | Tucker, Lowry (5) | Rocket Mortgage FieldHouse; 17,401 | 16–12 |
| 29 | December 15 | @ Philadelphia | W 101–96 | Gabe Vincent (26) | Dewayne Dedmon (14) | Dedmon, Lowry (5) | Wells Fargo Center; 20,389 | 17–12 |
| 30 | December 17 | @ Orlando | W 115–105 | Max Strus (32) | Ömer Yurtseven (12) | Kyle Lowry (15) | Amway Center; 14,103 | 18–12 |
| 31 | December 19 | @ Detroit | L 90–100 | Max Strus (24) | Ömer Yurtseven (12) | Kyle Lowry (10) | Little Caesars Arena; 15,188 | 18–13 |
| 32 | December 21 | Indiana | W 125–96 | Herro, Robinson (26) | Ömer Yurtseven (13) | Kyle Lowry (12) | FTX Arena; 19,600 | 19–13 |
| 33 | December 23 | Detroit | W 115–112 | Tyler Herro (29) | Ömer Yurtseven (12) | Gabe Vincent (7) | FTX Arena; 19,600 | 20–13 |
| 34 | December 26 | Orlando | W 93–83 | Butler, Martin (17) | Ömer Yurtseven (15) | Herro, Vincent (8) | FTX Arena; 19,600 | 21–13 |
| 35 | December 28 | Washington | W 119–112 | Tyler Herro (32) | Ömer Yurtseven (14) | Jimmy Butler (15) | FTX Arena; 19,600 | 22–13 |
| — | December 29 | @ San Antonio | Postponed due to COVID-19 pandemic, makeup date February 3 | | | | | |
| 36 | December 31 | @ Houston | W 120–110 | Jimmy Butler (37) | Ömer Yurtseven (13) | Tyler Herro (9) | Toyota Center; 16,197 | 23–13 |

January: 9–6 (home: 6–2; road: 3–4)

| Game | Date | Team | Score | High points | High rebounds | High assists | Location Attendance | Record |
|---|---|---|---|---|---|---|---|---|
| 37 | January 2 | @ Sacramento | L 113–115 | Herro, Yurtseven (22) | Ömer Yurtseven (16) | Kyle Lowry (12) | Golden 1 Center; 13,699 | 23–14 |
| 38 | January 3 | @ Golden State | L 108–115 | Jimmy Butler (22) | Ömer Yurtseven (17) | Kyle Lowry (11) | Chase Center; 18,064 | 23–15 |
| 39 | January 5 | @ Portland | W 115–109 | Max Strus (25) | Ömer Yurtseven (16) | Kyle Lowry (9) | Moda Center; 15,773 | 24–15 |
| 40 | January 8 | @ Phoenix | W 123–100 | Tyler Herro (33) | Ömer Yurtseven (16) | Kyle Lowry (13) | Footprint Center; 17,071 | 25–15 |
| 41 | January 12 | @ Atlanta | W 115–91 | Tyler Herro (21) | Martin, Yurtseven (10) | Tyler Herro (11) | State Farm Arena; 15,355 | 26–15 |
| 42 | January 14 | Atlanta | W 124–118 | Tyler Herro (24) | Ömer Yurtseven (11) | Jimmy Butler (10) | FTX Arena; 19,600 | 27–15 |
| 43 | January 15 | Philadelphia | L 98–109 | Ömer Yurtseven (22) | Ömer Yurtseven (11) | Jimmy Butler (9) | FTX Arena; 19,600 | 27–16 |
| 44 | January 17 | Toronto | W 104–99 | Tyler Herro (23) | Jimmy Butler (10) | Jimmy Butler (10) | FTX Arena; 19,600 | 28–16 |
| 45 | January 19 | Portland | W 104–92 | Caleb Martin (26) | Bam Adebayo (11) | Gabe Vincent (7) | FTX Arena; 19,600 | 29–16 |
| 46 | January 21 | @ Atlanta | L 108–110 | Bam Adebayo (21) | Jimmy Butler (8) | Gabe Vincent (9) | FTX Arena; 16,385 | 29–17 |
| 47 | January 23 | L.A. Lakers | W 113–107 | Duncan Robinson (25) | Jimmy Butler (10) | Jimmy Butler (12) | FTX Arena; 19,973 | 30–17 |
| 48 | January 26 | New York | W 110–96 | Duncan Robinson (25) | Bam Adebayo (8) | Bam Adebayo (11) | FTX Arena; 19,600 | 31–17 |
| 49 | January 28 | L.A. Clippers | W 121–114 | Jimmy Butler (26) | Bam Adebayo (12) | Jimmy Butler (9) | FTX Arena; 19,600 | 32–17 |
| 50 | January 29 | Toronto | L 120–124 (3OT) | Jimmy Butler (37) | Bam Adebayo (16) | Jimmy Butler (10) | FTX Arena; 19,600 | 32–18 |
| 51 | January 31 | @ Boston | L 92–122 | Max Strus (27) | Chris Silva (9) | Gabe Vincent (9) | TD Garden; 19,156 | 32–19 |

February: 9–2 (home: 3–1; road: 6–1)

| Game | Date | Team | Score | High points | High rebounds | High assists | Location Attendance | Record |
|---|---|---|---|---|---|---|---|---|
| 52 | February 1 | @ Toronto | L 106–110 | Bam Adebayo (32) | Bam Adebayo (11) | Jimmy Butler (12) | Scotiabank Arena; 0 | 32–20 |
| 53 | February 3 | @ San Antonio | W 112–95 | Tyler Herro (24) | Bam Adebayo (11) | Tyler Herro (5) | AT&T Center; 14,971 | 33–20 |
| 54 | February 5 | @ Charlotte | W 104–86 | Jimmy Butler (27) | Bam Adebayo (12) | Kyle Lowry (6) | Spectrum Center; 19,420 | 34–20 |
| 55 | February 7 | @ Washington | W 121–100 | Bam Adebayo (21) | Tucker, Adebayo (7) | Gabe Vincent (8) | Capital One Arena; 14,222 | 35–20 |
| 56 | February 10 | @ New Orleans | W 112–97 | Butler, Adebayo (29) | Kyle Lowry (11) | Kyle Lowry (11) | Smoothie King Center; 16,672 | 36–20 |
| 57 | February 12 | Brooklyn | W 115–111 | Bam Adebayo (19) | Bam Adebayo (14) | Kyle Lowry (6) | FTX Arena; 19,600 | 37–20 |
| 58 | February 15 | Dallas | L 99–107 | Jimmy Butler (29) | Bam Adebayo (12) | Gabe Vincent (5) | FTX Arena; 19,600 | 37–21 |
| 59 | February 17 | @ Charlotte | W 111–107 (2OT) | Kyle Lowry (25) | Bam Adebayo (13) | Jimmy Butler (8) | Spectrum Center; 17,029 | 38–21 |
| 60 | February 25 | @ New York | W 115–100 | Tyler Herro (25) | Bam Adebayo (16) | Adebayo, Lowry, Vincent (4) | Madison Square Garden; 19,812 | 39–21 |
| 61 | February 26 | San Antonio | W 133–129 | Bam Adebayo (36) | Dedmon, Martin (7) | Kyle Lowry (10) | FTX Arena; 19,677 | 40–21 |
| 62 | February 28 | Chicago | W 112–99 | Vincent, Herro (20) | Butler, Adebayo (7) | Adebayo, Herro (5) | FTX Arena; 19,683 | 41–21 |

March: 8–7 (home: 6–5; road: 2–2)

| Game | Date | Team | Score | High points | High rebounds | High assists | Location Attendance | Record |
|---|---|---|---|---|---|---|---|---|
| 63 | March 2 | @ Milwaukee | L 119–120 | Tyler Herro (30) | Bam Adebayo (12) | Gabe Vincent (6) | Fiserv Forum; 17,341 | 41–22 |
| 64 | March 3 | @ Brooklyn | W 113–107 | Bam Adebayo (30) | Bam Adebayo (11) | Tyler Herro (8) | Barclays Center; 17,732 | 42–22 |
| 65 | March 5 | Philadelphia | W 99–82 | Butler, Herro (21) | Bam Adebayo (10) | Jimmy Butler (5) | FTX Arena; 19,704 | 43–22 |
| 66 | March 7 | Houston | W 123–106 | Tyler Herro (31) | P. J. Tucker (12) | Kyle Lowry (5) | FTX Arena; 19,600 | 44–22 |
| 67 | March 9 | Phoenix | L 90–111 | Duncan Robinson (22) | Adebayo, Tucker (6) | Kyle Lowry (10) | FTX Arena; 19,600 | 44–23 |
| 68 | March 11 | Cleveland | W 117–105 | Bam Adebayo (30) | Bam Adebayo (17) | Kyle Lowry (10) | FTX Arena; 19,600 | 45–23 |
| 69 | March 12 | Minnesota | L 104–113 | Tyler Herro (30) | Bam Adebayo (12) | Kyle Lowry (7) | FTX Arena; 19,600 | 45–24 |
| 70 | March 15 | Detroit | W 105–98 | Tyler Herro (29) | Bam Adebayo (8) | Herro, Lowry (4) | FTX Arena; 19,600 | 46–24 |
| 71 | March 18 | Oklahoma City | W 120–108 | Tyler Herro (26) | Bam Adebayo (9) | Herro, Lowry, Vincent (4) | FTX Arena; 19,600 | 47–24 |
| 72 | March 21 | @ Philadelphia | L 106–113 | Jimmy Butler (27) | Bam Adebayo (9) | Butler, Lowry (6) | Wells Fargo Center; 21,386 | 47–25 |
| 73 | March 23 | Golden State | L 104–118 | Kyle Lowry (26) | Adebayo, Tucker (9) | Kyle Lowry (9) | FTX Arena; 19,600 | 47–26 |
| 74 | March 25 | New York | L 103–111 | Jimmy Butler (30) | Bam Adebayo (9) | Jimmy Butler (7) | FTX Arena; 19,600 | 47–27 |
| 75 | March 26 | Brooklyn | L 95–110 | Bam Adebayo (14) | Dewayne Dedmon (9) | Victor Oladipo (6) | FTX Arena; 19,600 | 47–28 |
| 76 | March 28 | Sacramento | W 123–100 | Jimmy Butler (27) | Bam Adebayo (15) | Jimmy Butler (7) | FTX Arena; 19,600 | 48–28 |
| 77 | March 30 | @ Boston | W 106–98 | Jimmy Butler (24) | Bam Adebayo (12) | Adebayo, Lowry (8) | TD Garden; 19,156 | 49–28 |

April: 4–1 (home: 2–0; road: 2–1)

| Game | Date | Team | Score | High points | High rebounds | High assists | Location Attendance | Record |
|---|---|---|---|---|---|---|---|---|
| 78 | April 2 | @ Chicago | W 127–109 | Jimmy Butler (22) | Herro, Tucker (8) | Kyle Lowry (10) | United Center; 21,697 | 50–28 |
| 79 | April 3 | @ Toronto | W 114–109 | Max Strus (23) | Adebayo, Herro (9) | Kyle Lowry (10) | Scotiabank Arena; 19,800 | 51–28 |
| 80 | April 5 | Charlotte | W 144–115 | Tyler Herro (35) | Bam Adebayo (9) | Jimmy Butler (8) | FTX Arena; 19,600 | 52–28 |
| 81 | April 8 | Atlanta | W 113–109 | Bam Adebayo (24) | Bam Adebayo (6) | Tyler Herro (9) | FTX Arena; 19,993 | 53–28 |
| 82 | April 10 | @ Orlando | L 111–125 | Victor Oladipo (40) | Oladipo, Yurtseven (10) | Victor Oladipo (7) | Amway Center; 19,253 | 53–29 |

2021–22 season schedule

=== Playoffs ===
2022 playoff game log
Total: 11–7 (home: 7–3; road: 4–4)
First Round: 4–1 (home: 3–0; road: 1–1)

| Game | Date | Team | Score | High points | High rebounds | High assists | Location Attendance | Series |
|---|---|---|---|---|---|---|---|---|
| 1 | April 17 | Atlanta | W 115–91 | Duncan Robinson (27) | Adebayo, Butler (6) | Kyle Lowry (9) | FTX Arena; 19,514 | 1–0 |
| 2 | April 19 | Atlanta | W 115–105 | Jimmy Butler (45) | Dewayne Dedmon (9) | Jimmy Butler (5) | FTX Arena; 19,950 | 2–0 |
| 3 | April 22 | @ Atlanta | L 110–111 | Tyler Herro (24) | Bam Adebayo (11) | Jimmy Butler (8) | State Farm Arena; 18,421 | 2–1 |
| 4 | April 24 | @ Atlanta | W 110–86 | Jimmy Butler (36) | Jimmy Butler (10) | Butler, Oladipo, Vincent (4) | State Farm Arena; 18,951 | 3–1 |
| 5 | April 26 | Atlanta | W 97–94 | Victor Oladipo (23) | Bam Adebayo (11) | Adebayo, Herro, Vincent (4) | FTX Arena; 19,553 | 4–1 |

Conference Semifinals: 4–2 (home: 3–0; road: 1–2)

| Game | Date | Team | Score | High points | High rebounds | High assists | Location Attendance | Series |
|---|---|---|---|---|---|---|---|---|
| 1 | May 2 | Philadelphia | W 106–92 | Tyler Herro (25) | Bam Adebayo (12) | Tyler Herro (7) | FTX Arena; 19,620 | 1–0 |
| 2 | May 4 | Philadelphia | W 119–103 | Bam Adebayo (23) | Bam Adebayo (9) | Jimmy Butler (12) | FTX Arena; 19,759 | 2–0 |
| 3 | May 6 | @ Philadelphia | L 79–99 | Jimmy Butler (33) | Jimmy Butler (9) | Kyle Lowry (3) | Wells Fargo Center; 21,033 | 2–1 |
| 4 | May 8 | @ Philadelphia | L 108–116 | Jimmy Butler (40) | Tyler Herro (10) | Kyle Lowry (7) | Wells Fargo Center; 21,194 | 2–2 |
| 5 | May 10 | Philadelphia | W 120–85 | Jimmy Butler (23) | Max Strus (10) | P.J. Tucker (7) | FTX Arena; 19,868 | 3–2 |
| 6 | May 12 | @ Philadelphia | W 99–90 | Jimmy Butler (32) | Max Strus (11) | Gabe Vincent (6) | Wells Fargo Center; 21,082 | 4–2 |

Conference Finals: 3–4 (home: 1–3; road: 2–1)

| Game | Date | Team | Score | High points | High rebounds | High assists | Location Attendance | Series |
|---|---|---|---|---|---|---|---|---|
| 1 | May 17 | Boston | W 118–107 | Jimmy Butler (41) | Jimmy Butler (9) | Jimmy Butler (5) | FTX Arena; 19,774 | 1–0 |
| 2 | May 19 | Boston | L 102–127 | Jimmy Butler (29) | Bam Adebayo (9) | Butler, Herro, Robinson, Vincent (3) | FTX Arena; 20,100 | 1–1 |
| 3 | May 21 | @ Boston | W 109–103 | Bam Adebayo (31) | Bam Adebayo (10) | Adebayo, Lowry (6) | TD Garden; 19,156 | 2–1 |
| 4 | May 23 | @ Boston | L 82–102 | Victor Oladipo (23) | Jimmy Butler (7) | Gabe Vincent (7) | TD Garden; 19,156 | 2–2 |
| 5 | May 25 | Boston | L 80–93 | Bam Adebayo (18) | P.J. Tucker (11) | Jimmy Butler (4) | FTX Arena; 19,819 | 2–3 |
| 6 | May 27 | @ Boston | W 111–103 | Jimmy Butler (47) | Adebayo, Butler (9) | Kyle Lowry (10) | TD Garden; 19,156 | 3–3 |
| 7 | May 29 | Boston | L 96–100 | Jimmy Butler (35) | Bam Adebayo (11) | Bam Adebayo (4) | FTX Arena; 20,200 | 3–4 |

2021–22 season schedule

== Player statistics ==
=== Regular season ===
| Player | POS | GP | GS | MP | REB | AST | STL | BLK | PTS | MPG | RPG | APG | SPG | BPG | PPG |
|---|---|---|---|---|---|---|---|---|---|---|---|---|---|---|---|
| Duncan Robinson | SG | 79 | 68 | 2,043 | 203 | 129 | 42 | 14 | 863 | 25.9 | 2.6 | 1.6 | .5 | .2 | 10.9 |
| P. J. Tucker | PF | 71 | 70 | 1,981 | 387 | 149 | 58 | 15 | 539 | 27.9 | 5.5 | 2.1 | .8 | .2 | 7.6 |
| Gabe Vincent | PG | 68 | 27 | 1,589 | 126 | 210 | 62 | 12 | 591 | 23.4 | 1.9 | 3.1 | .9 | .2 | 8.7 |
| Max Strus | SF | 68 | 16 | 1,587 | 202 | 92 | 28 | 16 | 721 | 23.3 | 3.0 | 1.4 | .4 | .2 | 10.6 |
| Dewayne Dedmon | C | 67 | 15 | 1,065 | 386 | 47 | 24 | 42 | 422 | 15.9 | 5.8 | .7 | .4 | .6 | 6.3 |
| Tyler Herro | SG | 66 | 10 | 2,151 | 329 | 263 | 44 | 8 | 1,367 | 32.6 | 5.0 | 4.0 | .7 | .1 | 20.7 |
| Kyle Lowry | PG | 63 | 63 | 2,133 | 282 | 474 | 67 | 17 | 844 | 33.9 | 4.5 | 7.5 | 1.1 | .3 | 13.4 |
| Caleb Martin | SF | 60 | 12 | 1,372 | 230 | 64 | 58 | 30 | 551 | 22.9 | 3.8 | 1.1 | 1.0 | .5 | 9.2 |
| Jimmy Butler | SF | 57 | 57 | 1,931 | 336 | 312 | 94 | 27 | 1,219 | 33.9 | 5.9 | 5.5 | 1.6 | .5 | 21.4 |
| Bam Adebayo | C | 56 | 56 | 1,825 | 564 | 190 | 80 | 44 | 1,068 | 32.6 | 10.1 | 3.4 | 1.4 | .8 | 19.1 |
| Ömer Yurtseven | C | 56 | 12 | 706 | 294 | 49 | 17 | 20 | 299 | 12.6 | 5.3 | .9 | .3 | .4 | 5.3 |
| KZ Okpala | PF | 21 | 0 | 244 | 41 | 14 | 4 | 7 | 77 | 11.6 | 2.0 | .7 | .2 | .3 | 3.7 |
| Haywood Highsmith | SF | 19 | 1 | 163 | 26 | 6 | 2 | 3 | 43 | 8.6 | 1.4 | .3 | .1 | .2 | 2.3 |
| Kyle Guy | SG | 19 | 0 | 186 | 17 | 17 | 7 | 1 | 74 | 9.8 | .9 | .9 | .4 | .1 | 3.9 |
| Markieff Morris | PF | 17 | 1 | 298 | 45 | 23 | 6 | 1 | 129 | 17.5 | 2.6 | 1.4 | .4 | .1 | 7.6 |
| Udonis Haslem | C | 13 | 0 | 83 | 25 | 4 | 1 | 1 | 32 | 6.4 | 1.9 | .3 | .1 | .1 | 2.5 |
| Marcus Garrett | SG | 12 | 0 | 128 | 23 | 7 | 5 | 3 | 13 | 10.7 | 1.9 | .6 | .4 | .3 | 1.1 |
| Chris Silva^{†} | PF | 9 | 0 | 88 | 35 | 7 | 0 | 1 | 26 | 9.8 | 3.9 | .8 | .0 | .1 | 2.9 |
| Victor Oladipo | SG | 8 | 1 | 173 | 23 | 28 | 5 | 1 | 99 | 21.6 | 2.9 | 3.5 | .6 | .1 | 12.4 |
| Javonte Smart^{†} | PG | 4 | 0 | 40 | 5 | 2 | 2 | 1 | 20 | 10.0 | 1.3 | .5 | .5 | .3 | 5.0 |
| Mychal Mulder^{†} | PG | 2 | 1 | 44 | 3 | 2 | 0 | 1 | 14 | 22.0 | 1.5 | 1.0 | .0 | .5 | 7.0 |
| Nik Stauskas^{†} | SG | 2 | 0 | 24 | 3 | 1 | 0 | 0 | 11 | 12.0 | 1.5 | .5 | .0 | .0 | 5.5 |

- ^{†} Denotes player spent time with another team in the season. Stats reflect time with the Heat only.

=== Playoffs ===
| Player | POS | GP | GS | MP | REB | AST | STL | BLK | PTS | MPG | RPG | APG | SPG | BPG | PPG |
|---|---|---|---|---|---|---|---|---|---|---|---|---|---|---|---|
| Bam Adebayo | C | 18 | 18 | 614 | 144 | 48 | 18 | 13 | 266 | 34.1 | 8.0 | 2.7 | 1.0 | .7 | 14.8 |
| Max Strus | SF | 18 | 18 | 523 | 73 | 38 | 14 | 8 | 196 | 29.1 | 4.1 | 2.1 | .8 | .4 | 10.9 |
| P. J. Tucker | PF | 18 | 18 | 509 | 102 | 32 | 14 | 5 | 142 | 28.3 | 5.7 | 1.8 | .8 | .3 | 7.9 |
| Gabe Vincent | PG | 18 | 8 | 423 | 35 | 57 | 14 | 5 | 144 | 23.5 | 1.9 | 3.2 | .8 | .3 | 8.0 |
| Jimmy Butler | SF | 17 | 17 | 629 | 125 | 78 | 35 | 11 | 466 | 37.0 | 7.4 | 4.6 | 2.1 | .6 | 27.4 |
| Caleb Martin | SF | 17 | 0 | 209 | 37 | 5 | 10 | 2 | 76 | 12.3 | 2.2 | .3 | .6 | .1 | 4.5 |
| Victor Oladipo | SG | 15 | 1 | 368 | 51 | 31 | 19 | 4 | 159 | 24.5 | 3.4 | 2.1 | 1.3 | .3 | 10.6 |
| Tyler Herro | SG | 15 | 0 | 381 | 58 | 42 | 9 | 6 | 189 | 25.4 | 3.9 | 2.8 | .6 | .4 | 12.6 |
| Dewayne Dedmon | C | 14 | 0 | 138 | 42 | 5 | 1 | 3 | 53 | 9.9 | 3.0 | .4 | .1 | .2 | 3.8 |
| Duncan Robinson | SG | 13 | 0 | 159 | 23 | 5 | 4 | 1 | 73 | 12.2 | 1.8 | .4 | .3 | .1 | 5.6 |
| Kyle Lowry | PG | 10 | 10 | 295 | 36 | 47 | 12 | 7 | 78 | 29.5 | 3.6 | 4.7 | 1.2 | .7 | 7.8 |
| Ömer Yurtseven | C | 9 | 0 | 38 | 7 | 3 | 0 | 1 | 25 | 4.2 | .8 | .3 | .0 | .1 | 2.8 |
| Haywood Highsmith | SF | 8 | 0 | 31 | 5 | 3 | 0 | 0 | 9 | 3.9 | .6 | .4 | .0 | .0 | 1.1 |
| Markieff Morris | PF | 1 | 0 | 3 | 1 | 0 | 0 | 0 | 0 | 3.0 | 1.0 | .0 | .0 | .0 | .0 |

== Transactions ==
=== Trades ===
| August 6, 2021 | To Miami Heat Kyle Lowry (Sign and trade) | To Toronto Raptors Goran Dragić; Precious Achiuwa |
| February 9, 2022 | To Miami Heat 2026 second-round pick | To Oklahoma City Thunder KZ Okpala |

=== Free agency ===
==== Re-signed ====
| Player | Signed |
|---|---|
| Gabe Vincent | 2-year contract worth $3.4 million |
| Max Strus | 2-year contract worth $3.4 million |
| Dewayne Dedmon | 1-year contract worth $2.3 million |
| Ömer Yurtseven | 2-year contract worth $3.2 million |
| Duncan Robinson | 5-year contract worth $90 million |
| Jimmy Butler | 3-year max extension contract worth $136 million |
| Victor Oladipo | 1-year contract worth $2.3 million |
| Udonis Haslem | 1-year contract worth $2.6 million |

==== Additions ====
| Player | Signed | Former team |
|---|---|---|
| Markieff Morris | 1-year contract worth $2.6 million | Los Angeles Lakers |
| P. J. Tucker | 2-year contract worth $14 million | Milwaukee Bucks |
| Marcus Garrett | Two-way contract | Kansas Jayhawks |
| Kyle Guy | Two-way contract | Cleveland Charge |
| Caleb Martin | 1-year contract worth $527,615 | Charlotte Hornets |
| Javonte Smart | Two-way contract | Sioux Falls Skyforce |
| Haywood Highsmith | 3-year contract worth $3.9 million | Delaware Blue Coats |
| Mychal Mulder | Two-way contract | Sioux Falls Skyforce |

==== Subtractions ====
| Player | Reason left | New Team |
|---|---|---|
| Trevor Ariza | 1-year contract worth $2.6 million | Los Angeles Lakers |
| Nemanja Bjelica | 1-year contract worth $2 million | Golden State Warriors |
| Kendrick Nunn | 2-year contract worth $10 million | Los Angeles Lakers |
| Andre Iguodala | 1-year contract worth $2.6 million | Golden State Warriors |
| Marcus Garrett | Waived | TBD |
| Kyle Guy | Waived | Cleveland Charge |
