= Marcus Garrett =

American basketball player (born 1998)

No. 13 – Wisconsin Herd
- Position: Shooting guard
- League: NBA G League

Personal information
- Born: November 9, 1998 (age 28) Dallas, Texas, U.S.
- Listed height: 6 ft 6 in (1.98 m)
- Listed weight: 196 lb (89 kg)

Career information
- High school: Skyline (Dallas, Texas)
- College: Kansas (2017–2021)
- NBA draft: 2021: undrafted
- Playing career: 2021–present

Career history
- 2021–2022: Miami Heat
- 2021–2022: →Sioux Falls Skyforce
- 2022–2023: Sioux Falls Skyforce
- 2023–2025: Greensboro Swarm
- 2025: Charlotte Hornets
- 2025–2026: Greensboro Swarm
- 2026–present: Wisconsin Herd

Career highlights
- NBA G League champion (2026); Naismith Defensive Player of the Year (2020); Second-team All-Big 12 (2021); Third-team All-Big 12 (2020); Big 12 Defensive Player of the Year (2020); 3× Big 12 All-Defensive Team (2019–2021)
- Stats at NBA.com
- Stats at Basketball Reference

Marcus Garrett (born November 9, 1998) is an American professional basketball player for the Wisconsin Herd of the NBA G League. He played college basketball for the Kansas Jayhawks.

== Early life ==
Garrett began playing basketball at the age of four. He grew up playing basketball, soccer and baseball but mainly focused on football. However, he quit football after breaking his right leg in sixth grade. As a result, Garrett shifted his attention to basketball and began being coached by his uncle and former San Diego State basketball player, Matt Watts. In eighth grade, he joined Watts' Amateur Athletic Union (AAU) team, Swag House, with whom he competed against high school juniors and seniors.

Garrett played for Skyline High School in Dallas, Texas and grew from 6'2" as a freshman. In his senior season, he averaged 17.3 points, 10.4 rebounds, 9.1 assists, 3.1 steals and 2.9 blocks per game, leading his team to the Class 6A state semifinals and earning Texas Gatorade Player of the Year honors. Garrett was a consensus four-star recruit and one of the top-ranked prospects from Texas in the 2017 class. He committed to playing college basketball for Kansas over Texas and Baylor, among others.

== College career ==
In his freshman season at Kansas, Garrett averaged 4.1 points, 3.4 rebounds and 1.1 assists in 19.2 minutes per game. He emerged as a defensive specialist for the Jayhawks but was deemed their "weak link" on the offensive end as he was not a good three-point shooter. On November 13, 2017, he shared Big 12 Conference Newcomer of the Week honors with Mohamed Bamba, after posting 10 points and 10 rebounds in a 92–56 win over Tennessee State. In his sophomore season, Garrett improved as a decision-maker, which helped him earn more playing time. He missed six games in February 2019 with a high ankle sprain. At the end of the season, Garrett was named to the Big 12 All-Defensive Team after averaging 7.3 points, 4.2 rebounds and 1.4 steals per game. On February 15, 2020, Garrett scored a career-high 24 points with six three-pointers, five rebounds, seven assists and four steals in an 87–70 win over Oklahoma. As a junior, he averaged 9.2 points, 4.6 assists, 4.5 rebounds and 1.8 steals per game and started in all 31 games. He was named Big 12 Defensive Player of the Year while also earning All-Defensive and third-team All-Big 12 accolades. On April 1, 2020, Garrett was named the Naismith Defensive Player of the Year Award winner. As a senior, he averaged 11 points, 4.6 rebounds, 3.7 assists and 1.6 steals per game. Garrett was named to the Second Team All-Big 12 and the Big 12 All-Defensive Team. On April 21, 2021, he declared for the 2021 NBA draft, forgoing his extra year of college eligibility.

== Professional career ==
=== Miami Heat (2021–2022) ===
After going undrafted in the 2021 NBA draft, Garrett joined the Miami Heat for the 2021 NBA Summer League. On September 2, 2021, he signed a two-way contract with the Heat. Under the terms of the deal, he split time between the Heat and their NBA G League affiliate, the Sioux Falls Skyforce. On January 16, 2022, Garrett was waived by the Heat.

On July 16, 2022, Garrett re-signed with the Heat on a two-way contract. He was waived on October 13 after he fractured his wrist.

=== Sioux Falls Skyforce (2022–2023) ===
On October 24, 2022, Garrett rejoined the Sioux Falls Skyforce roster for training camp.

=== Greensboro Swarm (2023–2025) ===
On September 26, 2023, Garrett signed with MHP Riesen Ludwigsburg of the Basketball Bundesliga and the Champions League, but didn't play for them. On December 11, he joined the Greensboro Swarm.

On September 11, 2024, Garrett signed with the Charlotte Hornets, but was waived on October 2. On October 27, he re-joined Greensboro.

=== Charlotte Hornets (2025) ===
On March 12, 2025, Garrett signed a 10-day contract with the Charlotte Hornets. However, when his contract expired on March 22, he was not re-signed by the team.

== Career statistics ==
Legend
GP	Games played	GS	Games started	MPG	Minutes per game
FG%	Field goal percentage	3P%	3-point field goal percentage	FT%	Free throw percentage
RPG	Rebounds per game	APG	Assists per game	SPG	Steals per game
BPG	Blocks per game	PPG	Points per game	**Bold**	Career high

=== NBA ===
Year	Team	GP	GS	MPG	FG%	3P%	FT%	RPG	APG	SPG	BPG	PPG
2021–22	Miami	**12**	0	10.7	.238	.250	.400	**1.9**	.6	.4	.3	1.1
2024–25	Charlotte	4	0	**19.8**	**.407**	**.375**	**.750**	1.5	**3.3**	**.8**	**.5**	**7.0**
Career		16	0	12.9	.333	.333	.556	1.8	1.3	.5	.3	2.6

=== College ===
Year	Team	GP	GS	MPG	FG%	3P%	FT%	RPG	APG	SPG	BPG	PPG
2017–18	Kansas	**39**	7	19.2	.456	.267	.490	3.4	1.1	.9	.2	4.1
2018–19	Kansas	30	13	27.9	.422	.245	.587	4.2	1.9	1.4	**.3**	7.3
2019–20	Kansas	31	**31**	32.2	.442	.327	.609	4.5	**4.6**	**1.8**	**.3**	9.2
2020–21	Kansas	29	29	**33.0**	**.459**	**.348**	**.808**	**4.6**	3.7	1.6	**.3**	**11.0**
Career		129	80	27.4	.445	.302	.635	4.1	2.7	1.4	.3	7.6
