= Gabe Vincent =

Nigerian-American basketball player (born 1996)

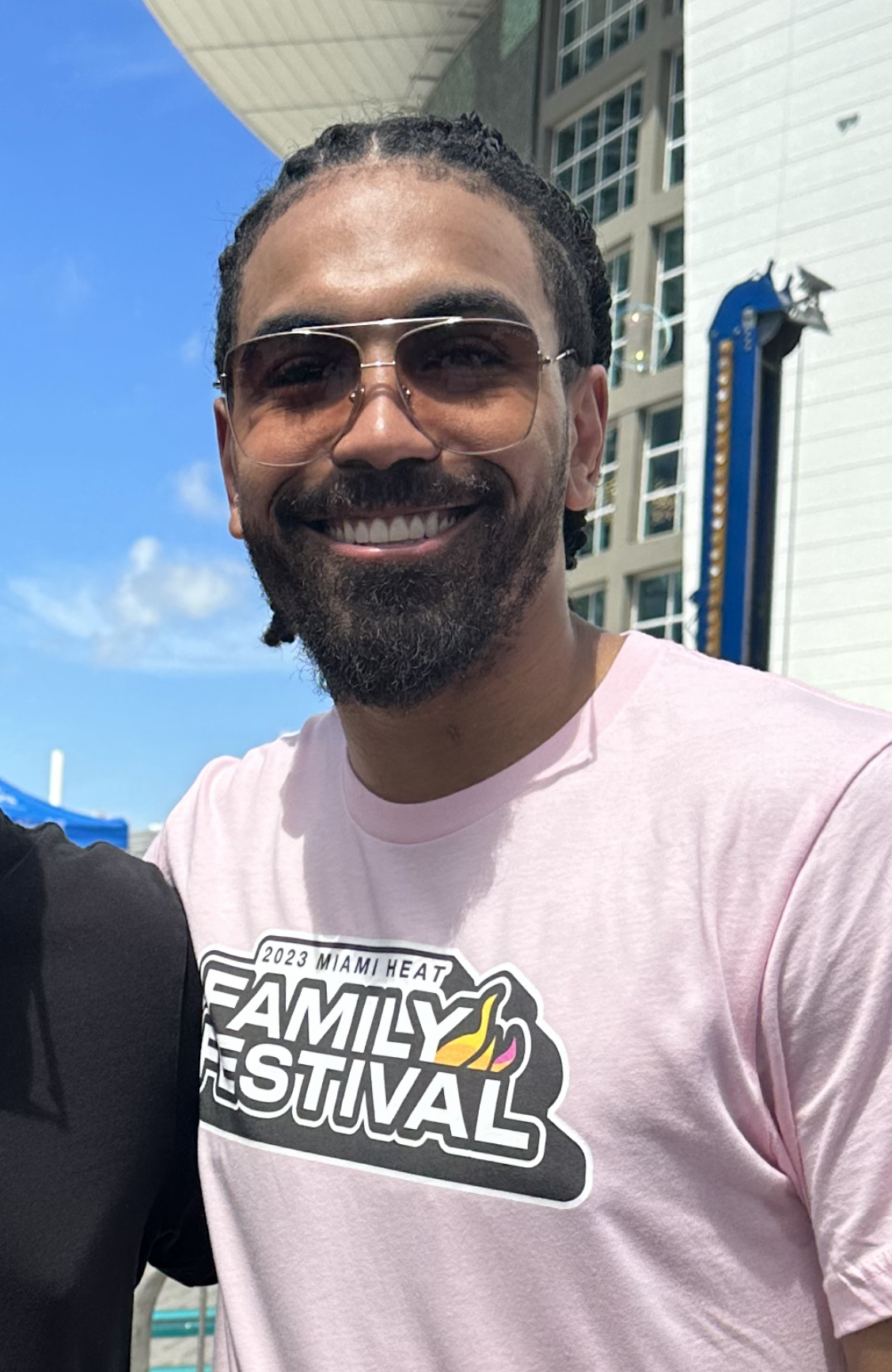
- Vincent in 2023

No. 7 – Sacramento Kings
- Position: Point guard

Personal information
- Born: June 14, 1996 (age 30) Modesto, California, U.S.
- Listed height: 6 ft 2 in (1.88 m)
- Listed weight: 200 lb (91 kg)

Career information
- High school: St. Mary's (Stockton, California)
- College: UC Santa Barbara (2014–2018)
- NBA draft: 2018: undrafted
- Playing career: 2018–present

Career history
- 2018–2020: Stockton Kings
- 2020–2023: Miami Heat
- 2020–2021: →Sioux Falls Skyforce
- 2023–2026: Los Angeles Lakers
- Atlanta Hawks
- Sacramento Kings

Career highlights
- NBA Cup champion (2023); NBA G League Most Improved Player (2020)
- Stats at NBA.com
- Stats at Basketball Reference

Gabriel Nnamdi Vincent (born June 14, 1996) is a Nigerian-American professional basketball player who plays for the Sacramento Kings of the National Basketball Association (NBA). He also represents the Nigerian national basketball team. He played college basketball for the UC Santa Barbara Gauchos. Undrafted out of college, Vincent signed with the Stockton Kings of the NBA G League before joining the Miami Heat on a two-way contract. With Miami, he reached the NBA Finals in 2020 and 2023 before signing with the Los Angeles Lakers.

== Early life and education ==
Vincent was born in Modesto, California, to Franklyn and Cynthia Vincent. His father is Nigerian and his American mother is from Connecticut. They both earned doctorates in psychology. The youngest of three brothers, Vincent attended St. Mary's High School in Stockton.

== College career ==
Vincent played college basketball for University of California, Santa Barbara from 2014 to 2018, averaging 12.8 points in 113 games. After his senior season, he was named to the 2018 All-Big West Second Team.

== Professional career ==
=== Stockton Kings (2018–2020) ===
After graduating, Vincent had a pre-draft workout with the Sacramento Kings. Although he went undrafted in the 2018 NBA draft, he signed an Exhibit 10 contract with Sacramento on October 2. He was waived a few days later. He played 24 games, with three starts, for the Stockton Kings of the NBA G League during the 2018–19 season, averaging 8.8 points in 18.6 minutes per game. He scored 35 points in a game twice for the Kings in December 2019. Vincent played in 20 games (three starts) in his second season with Stockton while averaging 23.4 points, 3.8 rebounds, 2.5 assists and 1.30 steals per game and shooting 46.9 percent from the field, 41.2 percent from three-point range and 89.7 percent from the free throw line.

=== Miami Heat (2020–2023) ===
On January 8, 2020, the Miami Heat announced that they had signed Vincent to a two-way contract. He made his NBA debut against the Orlando Magic on January 29. In the G League, Vincent tallied 27 points, three assists and one rebound in a win over the Salt Lake City Stars on February 3. He averaged 20.9 points, 3.1 rebounds and 2.3 assists per game in 31 G League games. On June 22, 2020, the NBA G League announced that Vincent won the Most Improved Player award. The Heat reached the 2020 NBA Finals, but lost in six games to the Los Angeles Lakers.

On August 1, 2021, Vincent joined the Heat for the NBA Summer League and five days later, he signed a standard contract with the Heat.

In game 3 of the 2023 Eastern Conference Finals, Vincent scored a playoff career high of 29 points in a 128–102 win to give the Heat a 3–0 lead over the Boston Celtics. The Heat eventually advanced to the NBA Finals after winning the series in seven games. In game 2 of the 2023 NBA Finals, Vincent had a team-high 23 points in a 111–108 win over the Denver Nuggets to tie the series 1–1. Vincent struggled to shoot from the three-point line in the NBA Finals, shooting just 33% from beyond the arc. The Heat went on to lose the series in five games.

=== Los Angeles Lakers (2023–2026) ===
On July 6, 2023, Vincent signed a three-year, $33 million contract with the Los Angeles Lakers. He made only 11 appearances for the Lakers in the 2023–24 NBA season, averaging 3.1 points, 0.8 rebounds and 1.9 assists.

Vincent made 72 appearances (including 11 starts) for Los Angeles during the 2024–25 season, averaging 6.4 points, 1.3 rebounds and 1.4 assists. He played in 29 games (including seven starts) for the team in the 2025–26 season, posting averages of 4.8 points, 0.9 rebounds and 1.3 assists.

=== Atlanta Hawks (2026) ===
On February 5, 2026, Vincent and a future second-round pick were traded to the Atlanta Hawks in exchange for guard Luke Kennard.

== National team career ==
Vincent represents the Nigerian national team, D'Tigers. On August 24, 2019, he scored 23 points against Poland, including the game-winning three-pointer with 0.3 seconds left. He represented the Nigerian team at the 2019 FIBA Basketball World Cup in China.

== Career statistics ==
Legend
GP	Games played	GS	Games started	MPG	Minutes per game
FG%	Field goal percentage	3P%	3-point field goal percentage	FT%	Free throw percentage
RPG	Rebounds per game	APG	Assists per game	SPG	Steals per game
BPG	Blocks per game	PPG	Points per game	**Bold**	Career high

=== NBA ===
==== Regular season ====
Year	Team	GP	GS	MPG	FG%	3P%	FT%	RPG	APG	SPG	BPG	PPG
2019–20	Miami	9	0	9.2	.216	.222	–	.6	.7	.6	.0	2.4
2020–21	Miami	50	7	13.1	.378	.309	.870	1.1	1.3	.4	.0	4.8
2021–22	Miami	68	27	23.4	**.417**	.368	.815	1.9	**3.1**	**.9**	**.2**	8.7
2022–23	Miami	68	**34**	**25.9**	.402	.334	.872	**2.1**	2.5	**.9**	.1	**9.4**
2023–24	L.A. Lakers	11	0	19.8	.306	.107	.500	.8	1.9	.8	.0	3.1
2024–25	L.A. Lakers	**72**	11	21.2	.400	.353	.714	1.3	1.4	.7	**.2**	6.4
2025–26	L.A. Lakers	29	7	19.3	.346	**.369**	**.909**	.9	1.3	.5	.0	4.8
2025–26	Atlanta	24	0	13.3	.360	.300	.833	1.1	1.6	.5	.1	3.9
Career		331	86	20.3	.392	.338	.836	1.5	1.9	.7	.1	6.7

==== Playoffs ====
Year	Team	GP	GS	MPG	FG%	3P%	FT%	RPG	APG	SPG	BPG	PPG
2020	Miami	1	0	.3	—	—	—	.0	.0	.0	.0	0.0
2021	Miami	3	0	4.7	**.667**	**.500**	—	.3	.7	.0	.0	1.7
2022	Miami	18	8	23.5	.382	.309	**.950**	**1.9**	3.2	.8	.3	8.0
2023	Miami	**22**	**22**	**30.5**	.402	.378	.882	1.4	**3.5**	**.9**	.2	**12.7**
2024	L.A. Lakers	5	0	13.8	.250	.143	—	1.6	.6	.4	.0	1.4
2025	L.A. Lakers	5	0	19.8	.357	.308	—	1.0	1.0	.2	**.4**	2.8
2026	Atlanta	6	0	15.5	.364	.333	.800	.5	1.2	.3	.2	4.3
Career		60	30	22.8	.390	.344	.898	1.4	2.5	.6	.2	7.9

=== College ===
Year	Team	GP	GS	MPG	FG%	3P%	FT%	RPG	APG	SPG	BPG	PPG
2014–15	UC Santa Barbara	28	21	26.2	.424	**.416**	.660	2.1	2.1	.9	.1	10.1
2015–16	UC Santa Barbara	**33**	**32**	**32.0**	.406	.385	**.808**	3.2	2.2	**1.2**	**.2**	14.1
2016–17	UC Santa Barbara	20	18	**32.0**	.355	.329	.762	**3.7**	2.4	.8	.1	**14.8**
2017–18	UC Santa Barbara	32	30	29.1	**.450**	.377	.805	1.9	**3.3**	1.1	**.2**	12.4
Career		113	101	29.7	.409	.376	.769	2.7	2.5	1.0	.2	12.8
