= Superteams in the NBA =

A superteam in the National Basketball Association (NBA) is a team that uses player acquisitions (via trades or free agency) in a short period of time to create a higher than average concentration of top-level players. While there is no official definition, it is generally viewed as a team with three or more Hall of Fame, All-NBA, or perennial All-Star players that join together to pursue an NBA championship.

== NBA championship-winning superteams ==
=== 1968–1973: Los Angeles Lakers ===
Los Angeles Lakers superteam

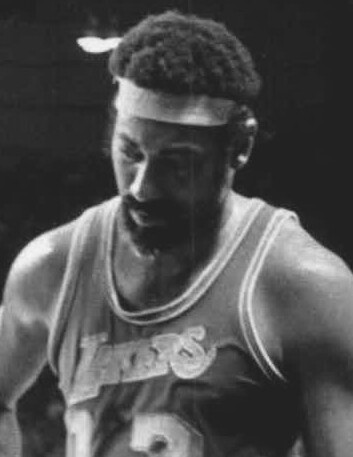
Wilt Chamberlain

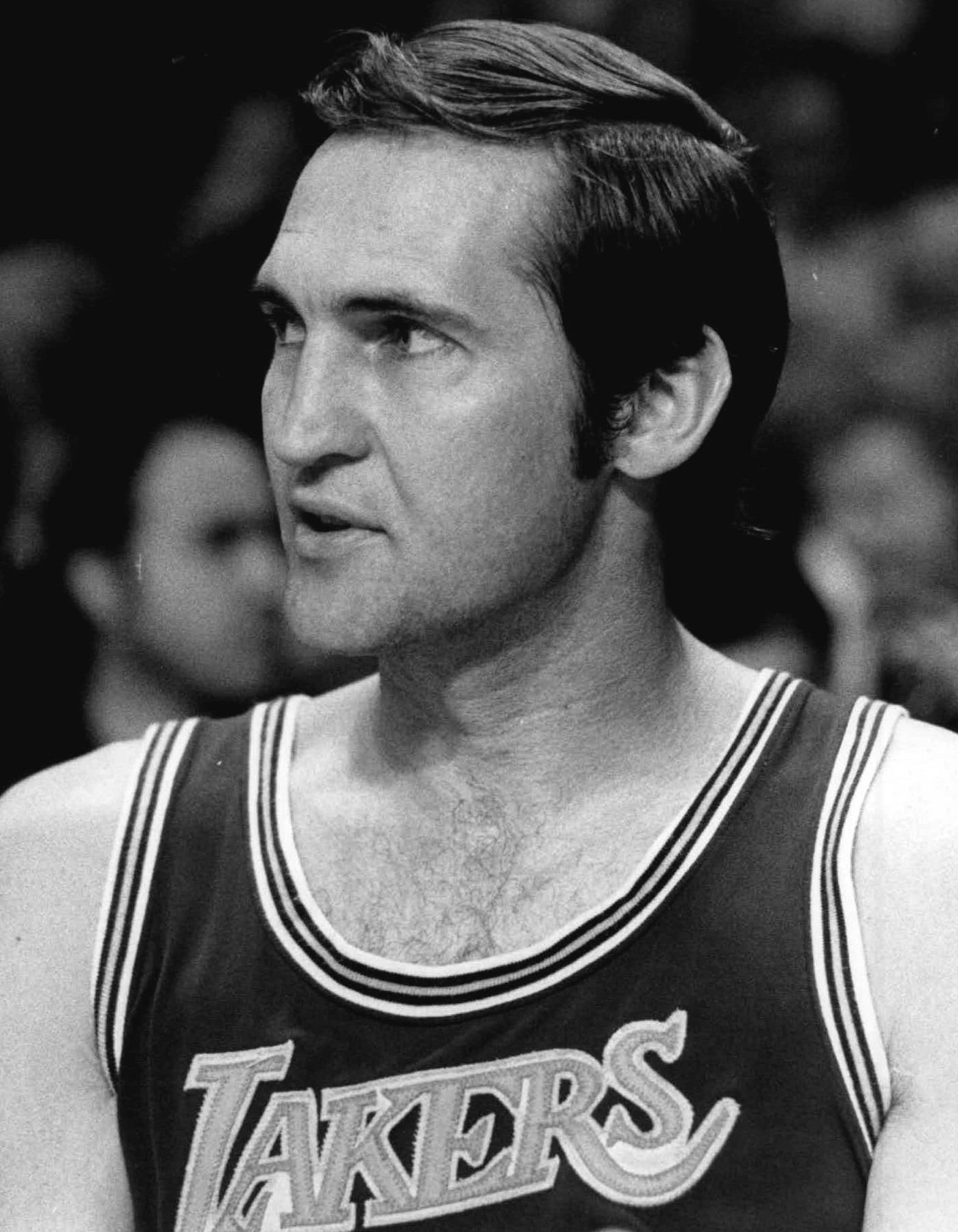
Jerry West

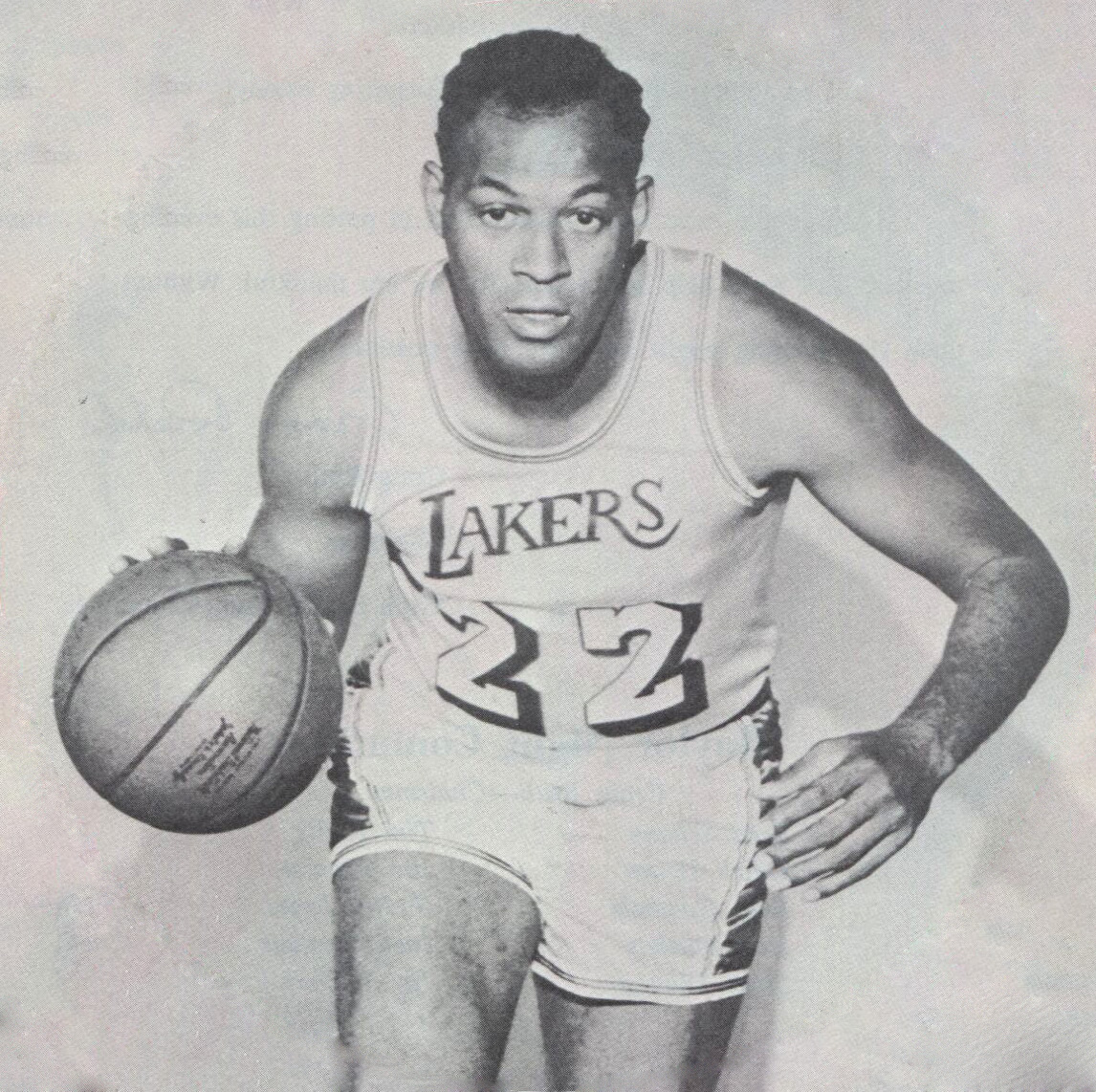
Elgin Baylor

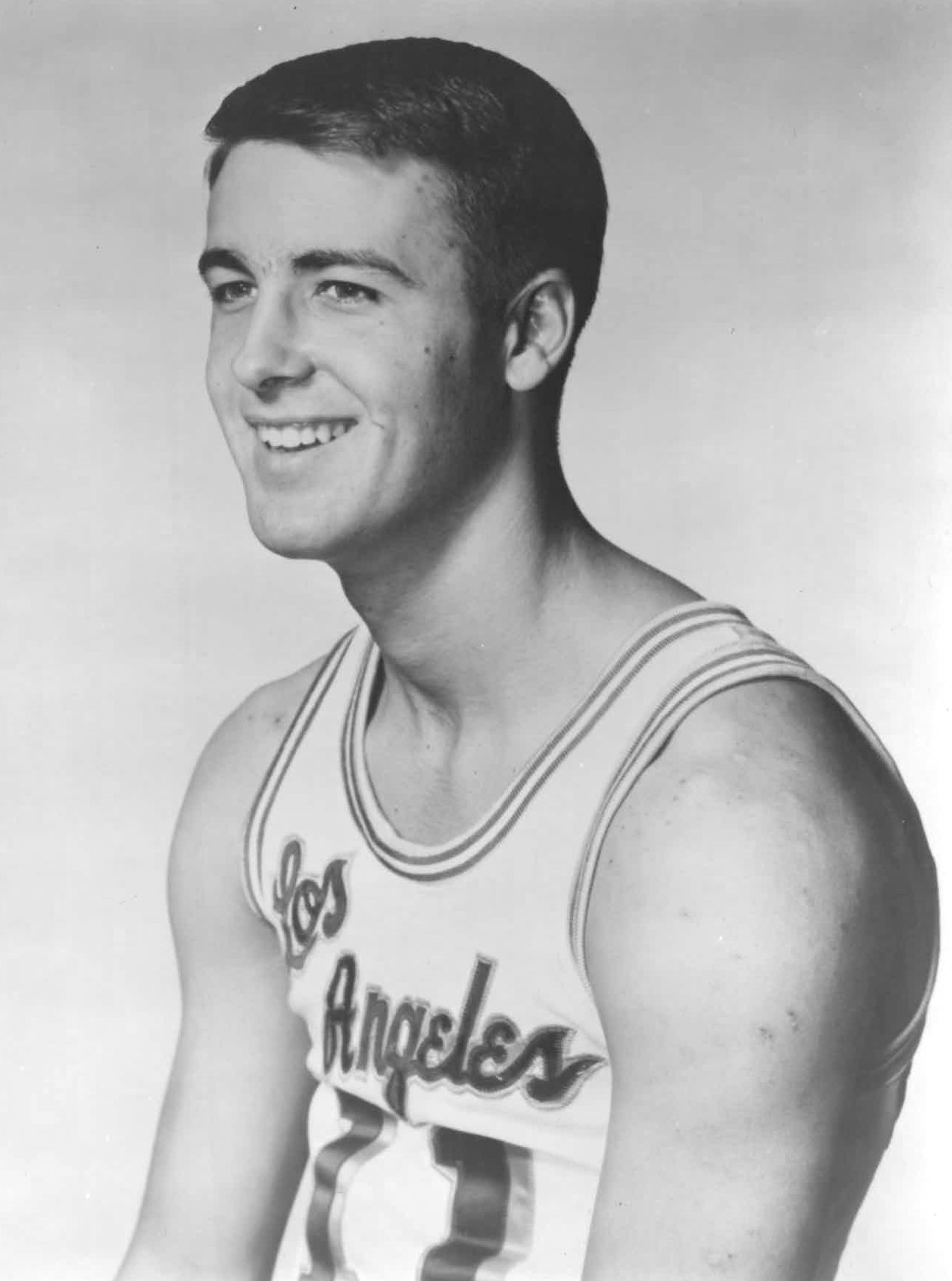
Gail Goodrich

The earliest example of a superteam not being developed through the draft was superstar Wilt Chamberlain joining Jerry West and Elgin Baylor on the Los Angeles Lakers in the 1968 offseason. This trio reached the NBA Finals on two separate occasions, both times losing in a game seven, first to the Boston Celtics in 1969 and then to the New York Knicks in 1970. The team then reacquired Gail Goodrich from the Phoenix Suns after previously losing him in the 1968 NBA expansion draft. The Lakers eventually won the NBA championship in 1972 while recording what was at the time the best regular season record ever at 69–13 (including the longest winning streak in NBA history at 33 straight victories), but Baylor had retired early in the season due to injuries. Nevertheless, Baylor still earned a championship ring for his services to the team. Chamberlain retired in 1973, ending what can be considered the first superteam in NBA history; West later retired as a player in 1974, while Goodrich left in free agency in 1976.

=== 1979–1991: Los Angeles Lakers ===
Los Angeles Lakers superteam

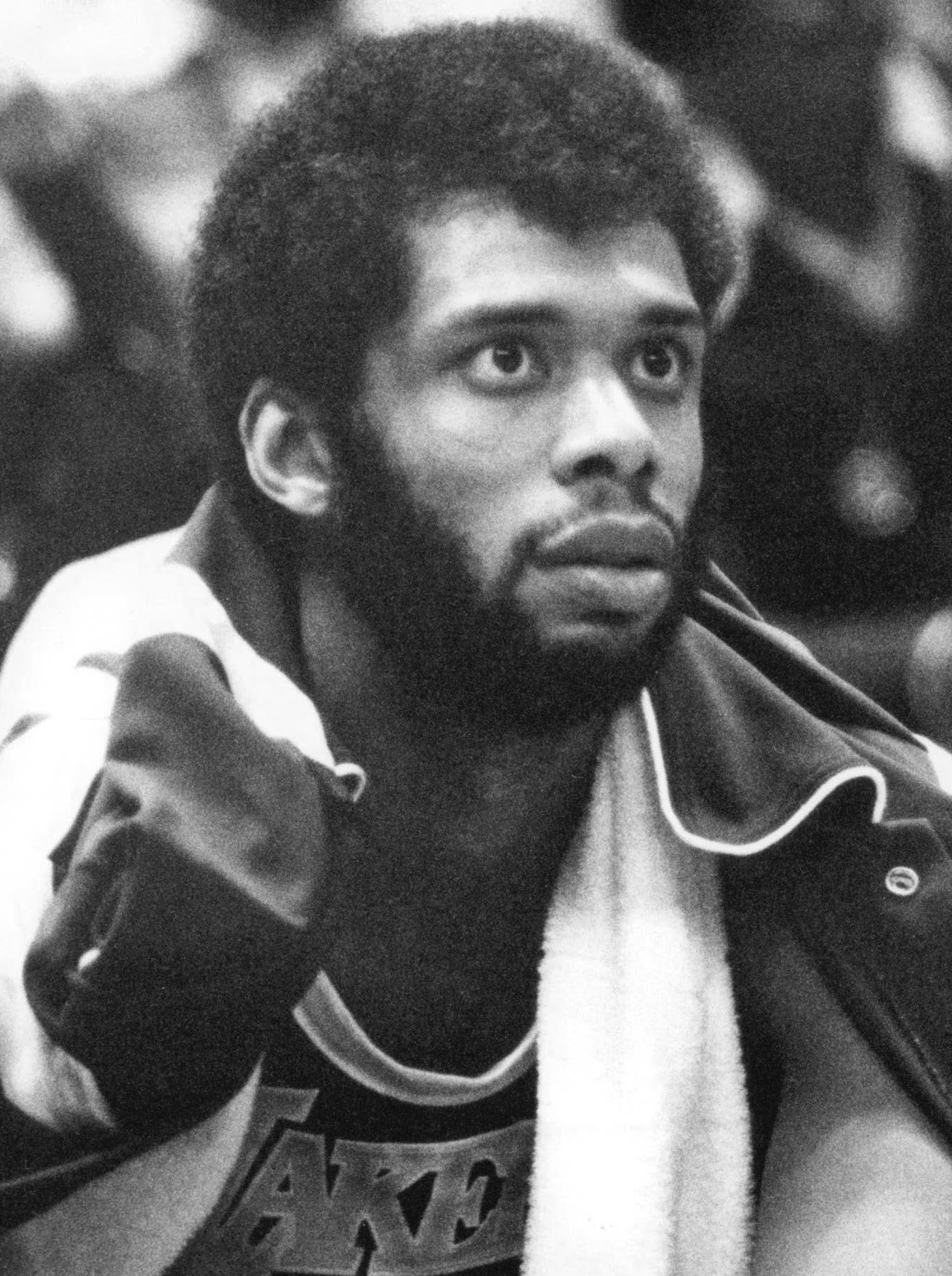
Kareem Abdul-Jabbar

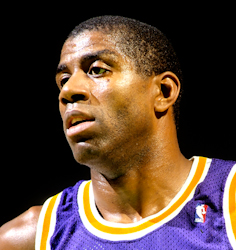
Magic Johnson

James Worthy

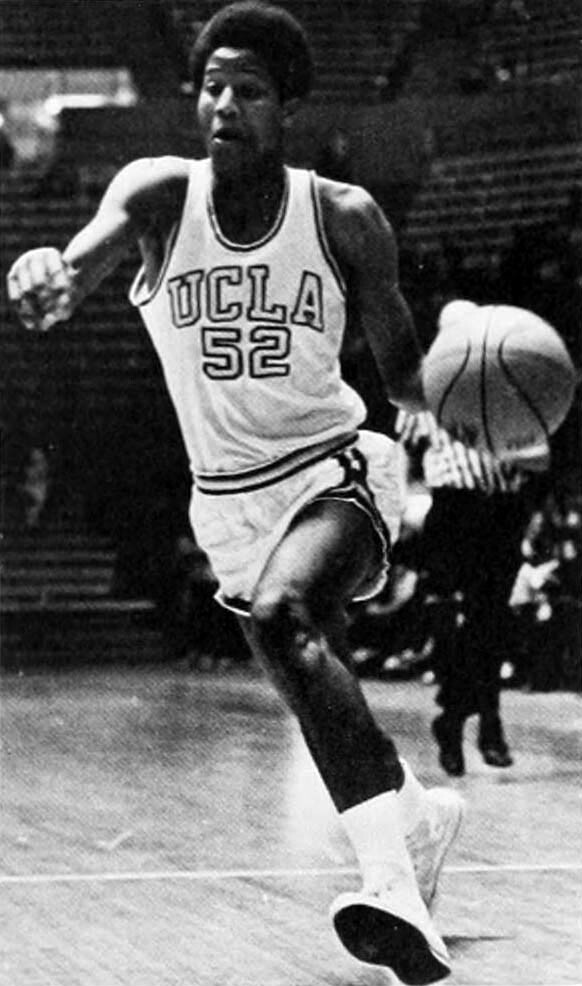
Jamaal Wilkes

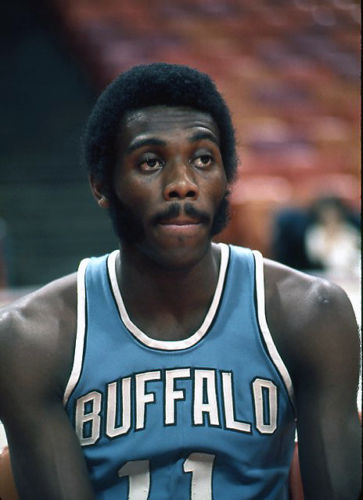
Bob McAdoo

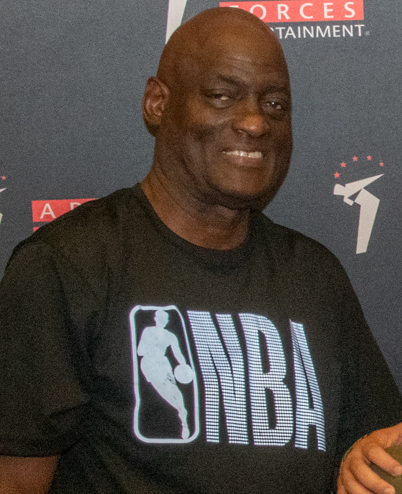
Michael Cooper

On June 16, 1975, the Los Angeles Lakers made a blockbuster trade to acquire Kareem Abdul-Jabbar from the Milwaukee Bucks. In 1977, the Lakers signed Jamaal Wilkes in free agency after the Golden State Warriors declined to match the Lakers' offer. In the 1978 NBA draft the Lakers drafted Michael Cooper as the 60th pick, who would be a key role-player in the showtime championships. In the 1979 NBA draft, new owner Jerry Buss drafted Earvin "Magic" Johnson with the #1 pick acquired via trade with the New Orleans Jazz. The Lakers saw immediate success, forming the foundation of the team that would be dubbed Showtime, and winning the 1980 NBA Finals over the Philadelphia 76ers, with rookie Johnson winning Finals MVP.

The team reached the playoffs a year later but suffered a stunning upset in the first round at the hands of the eventual Western Conference champion Houston Rockets. The Lakers responded by not only firing coach Paul Westhead and replacing him with former Lakers player Pat Riley, but also by acquiring former MVP Bob McAdoo from the New Jersey Nets on a Christmas Eve trade in 1981. These moves helped lift the Lakers to their second NBA championship of the Showtime era in 1982. In the offseason, the team selected forward James Worthy as the #1 pick in the 1982 NBA draft due to a trade with the Cleveland Cavaliers. The Lakers then reached the NBA Finals in both 1983 and 1984, losing to the Philadelphia 76ers and Boston Celtics.

The 1984–85 Los Angeles Lakers accumulated a 62-20 record in the regular season and reached the 1985 NBA Finals to face the Boston Celtics again, this time taking their revenge in a 4-2 series win. Despite the departures of Jamaal Wilkes and Bob McAdoo, the team posted an identical regular season record in the following year, but were upset in a shocking loss in the Western Conference Finals to the Rockets, this time led by Hakeem Olajuwon. After this defeat, the 1986–87 Los Angeles Lakers embarked on one of the greatest seasons in franchise history, winning 65 games in the regular season and posting a 15-3 record in the playoffs that culminated in a win over the Celtics in the 1987 NBA Finals. The Lakers achieved their first repeat championship of the era with a 4-3 win over the "Bad Boys" Detroit Pistons in the 1988 NBA Finals. After losing a rematch with the Pistons in the 1989 NBA Finals, Abdul-Jabbar announced his retirement from the NBA. The Showtime era continued through early 1990s, including an NBA Finals appearance in 1991 under new head coach Mike Dunleavy Sr., but they were unable to recapture the success of the 1980s. Johnson announced his retirement from the sport during the 1991 preseason after revealing he had tested positive for HIV, with Worthy retiring 1994.

=== 1980–1988: Boston Celtics ===
Boston Celtics superteam

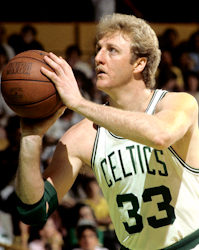
Larry Bird

Kevin McHale

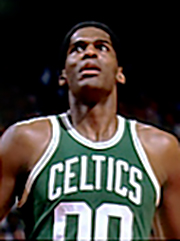
Robert Parish

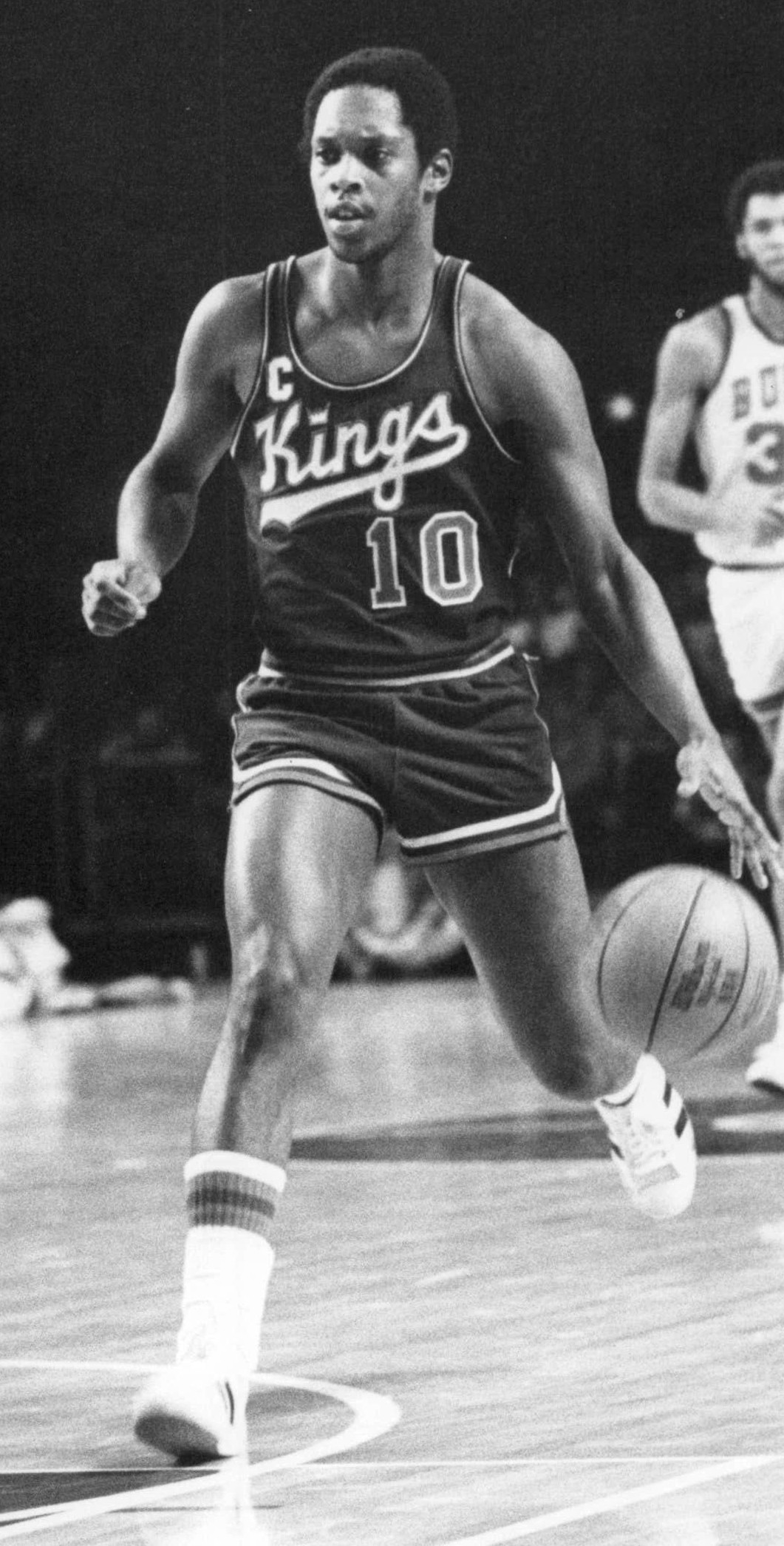
Nate Archibald

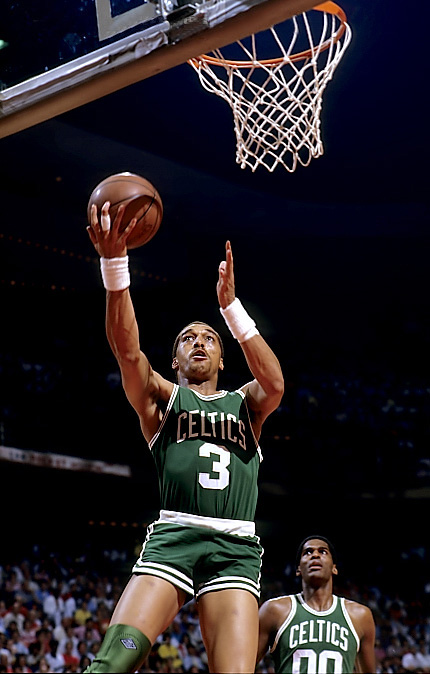
Dennis Johnson

With the sixth pick of the 1978 NBA draft, the Celtics selected Larry Bird, who returned to school at Indiana State University for another season rather than playing professionally. The team finished with a 29-53 record. Bird joined the Celtics for the 1979–80 NBA season and guided the team to a 32 win improvement, achieving a 61-21 record and an Eastern Conference Finals appearance. The team further bolstered their roster in the following offseason, trading the #1 and #13 picks in the NBA draft to the Golden State Warriors to acquire center Robert Parish and the #3 pick of the draft, used to select power forward Kevin McHale. These players combined with Bird for what pundits and analysts consider to be one of the best frontcourts in NBA history. The Celtics further improved upon their previous season, winning 62 games in the regular season and the 1981 NBA Finals over the Houston Rockets led by Moses Malone.

After failing to reach the NBA Finals in the next two seasons, the Celtics traded with the Phoenix Suns to acquire All-Star guard and former NBA Finals MVP winner Dennis Johnson, which also let them waive Archibald afterward. The Celtics made an immediate return to their postseason success, winning the 1984 NBA Finals 4–3 over the longtime rival Los Angeles Lakers. On September 6, 1985, the team traded for former MVP and NBA champion Bill Walton. The Celtics completed one of the most impressive seasons in NBA history, winning 67 games in the regular season and a 15-3 run in the playoffs that culminated with a win in the 1986 NBA Finals against a Houston Rockets led by the center duo of Hakeem Olajuwon and Ralph Sampson. As a result of their historic dominance and overwhelming star power, the 1985–86 Boston Celtics are widely considered one of the greatest teams in NBA history.

Despite losing #2 pick Len Bias to a drug overdose days after the 1986 NBA draft and a drug scandal involving Dennis Johnson, the Celtics returned to the NBA Finals once again in 1987, this time falling to the Lakers 4-2. The Celtics were unable to recreate their championship success in the following seasons, losing in the Eastern Conference playoffs to "Bad Boys" era Detroit Pistons and New York Knicks. Afterwards, the team slowly came apart, with Dennis Johnson retiring first after failing to acquire a new contract with Boston in 1990, followed by Larry Bird retiring in 1992 after years of battling injuries, McHale retiring in 1993 and Robert Parish signing with the Charlotte Hornets in 1994.

=== 1982–1986: Philadelphia 76ers ===
Philadelphia 76ers superteam

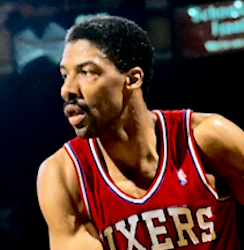
Julius Erving

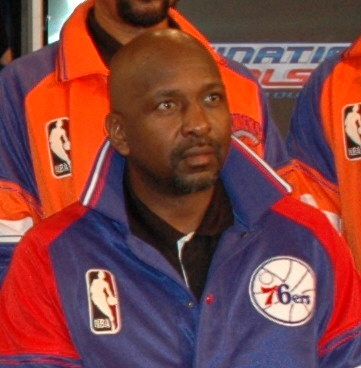
Moses Malone

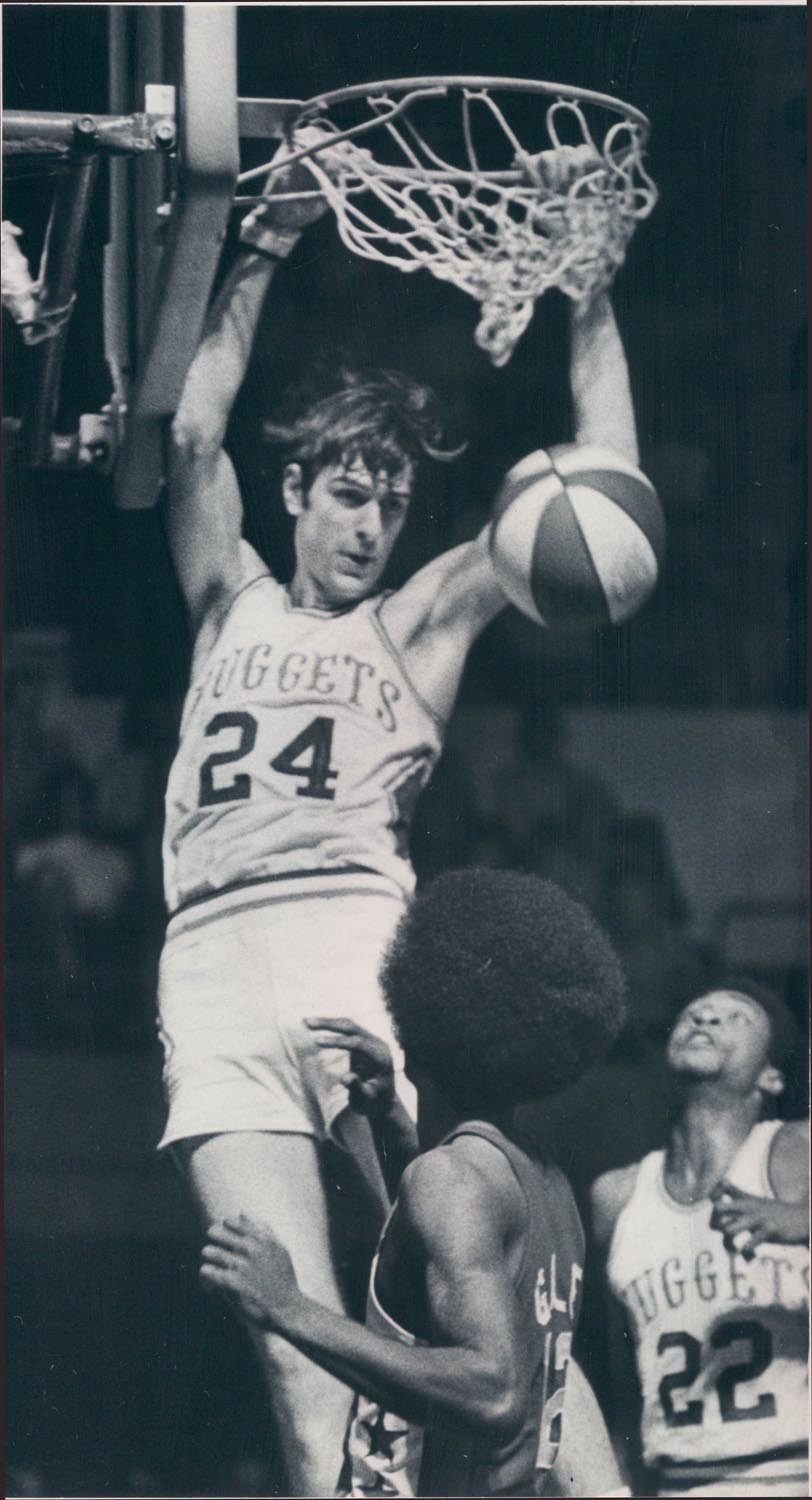
Bobby Jones

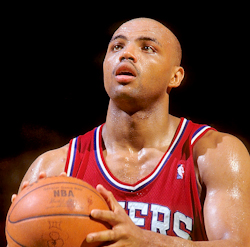
Charles Barkley

After the NBA-ABA merger, the Philadelphia 76ers obtained the player rights for Julius Erving from the New York Nets, reaching the 1977 NBA Finals in his first year with the team. In the following seasons, the team traded with the Denver Nuggets to acquire Bobby Jones and also drafted guards Maurice Cheeks and Andrew Toney. As a result, the 76ers made both the 1980 and 1982 NBA Finals, losing in 6 games to the Los Angeles Lakers each time. The 76ers became an undisputed superteam on September 15, 1982, when restricted free agent Moses Malone was acquired in a sign-and-trade with the Houston Rockets. The 1982–83 Philadelphia 76ers achieved a 65–17 record in the regular season, and when asked how they would fare in the playoffs, Malone answered "fo, fo, fo", predicting a sweep in each series. The Sixers nearly achieved Malone's boast, sweeping the New York Knicks, defeating the Milwaukee Bucks in five games, and winning the third championship in franchise history with a four-game sweep of the defending champion Lakers in the 1983 NBA Finals.

The following season, the 76ers only managed a 52–30 record and were upset in the First Round by the New Jersey Nets. In the 1984 NBA draft, the 76ers drafted Charles Barkley with the 5th overall pick. With the inclusion of Barkley, the 76ers improved to a 58–24 record and reached the Conference Finals, where they were eliminated by the Boston Celtics in 5 games. The following season, the 76ers had a 54–28 record and were eliminated in the Conference Semifinals by the Milwaukee Bucks in 7 games. In the offseason, Bobby Jones announced his retirement and the 76ers traded Moses Malone to the Washington Bullets, ending the superteam era of the Philadelphia 76ers with the sole championship. Julius Erving later retired in 1987 and other notable players slowly left over the following years.

=== 1995–1998: Chicago Bulls ===
Chicago Bulls superteam

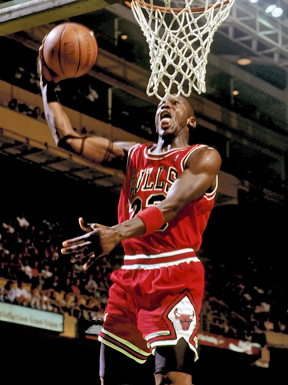
Michael Jordan

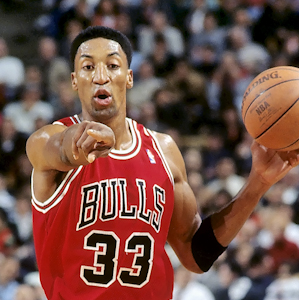
Scottie Pippen

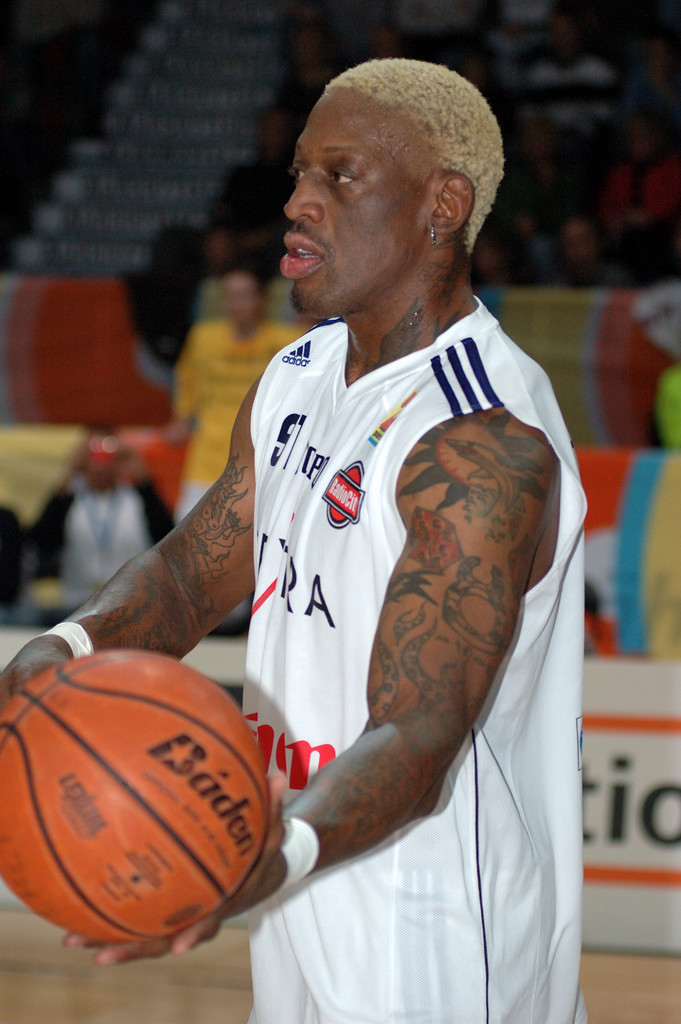
Dennis Rodman

At the beginning of the decade, the Chicago Bulls had won three straight championships from 1991 to 1993 with Michael Jordan and Scottie Pippen leading a team coached by Phil Jackson. Following this three-peat, Jordan retired from the NBA after the 1993 championship, choosing to pursue professional baseball in honor of his recently deceased father's memory. Before the end of the 1994–95 season, Jordan announced his return to the team and the league, but the Bulls were unable to repeat their former championship success and fell to the Orlando Magic in the 1995 NBA Playoffs. During the following offseason, the Bulls traded for the eccentric former two-time NBA Defensive Player of the Year winner Dennis Rodman. The Bulls finished their first season together with a 72–10 regular season record, setting NBA records for the most wins, highest winning percentage, and highest net rating in a single season, the latter of which still stands. Their dominance continued in the playoffs, posting a 15–3 playoff record and winning their fourth championship in six years. The 1995–96 Chicago Bulls have since been regarded as one of the greatest teams in NBA history.

Following this triumphant season, the Bulls repeated their success in the following year with a 69–13 regular season record and a 15–4 playoff record for the team's fifth championship win in franchise history. The series win in the 1997 NBA Finals in six games over the Utah Jazz was highlighted by Jordan's "Flu Game", during which Jordan was purportedly ill from food poisoning. The 1997–98 NBA season proved more challenging for the Bulls, as tensions in the front office, an aging roster, and injuries to key players threatened to derail the team. Despite these struggles, detailed in the 2020 documentary series The Last Dance, Jordan still managed to lead the team to a 62-20 regular season record. Pushed to seven games by Indiana Pacers in the Eastern Conference Finals, the Bulls emerged victorious and reached their third NBA Finals in a row and their sixth in eight years. The team completed their second three-peat by beating the Jazz 4–2 in a rematch of the previous season, with Game 6 of the 1998 NBA Finals famously ending with Jordan's last shot in a Bulls uniform, a play now considered one of the greatest moments in NBA history. The Bulls' dynasty disbanded the following offseason during which Phil Jackson was relieved as head coach, Michael Jordan announced his retirement from the NBA for the second time, and many of the team's key players were traded or signed to new teams in free agency.

=== 2007–2012: Boston Celtics ===
Boston Celtics superteam

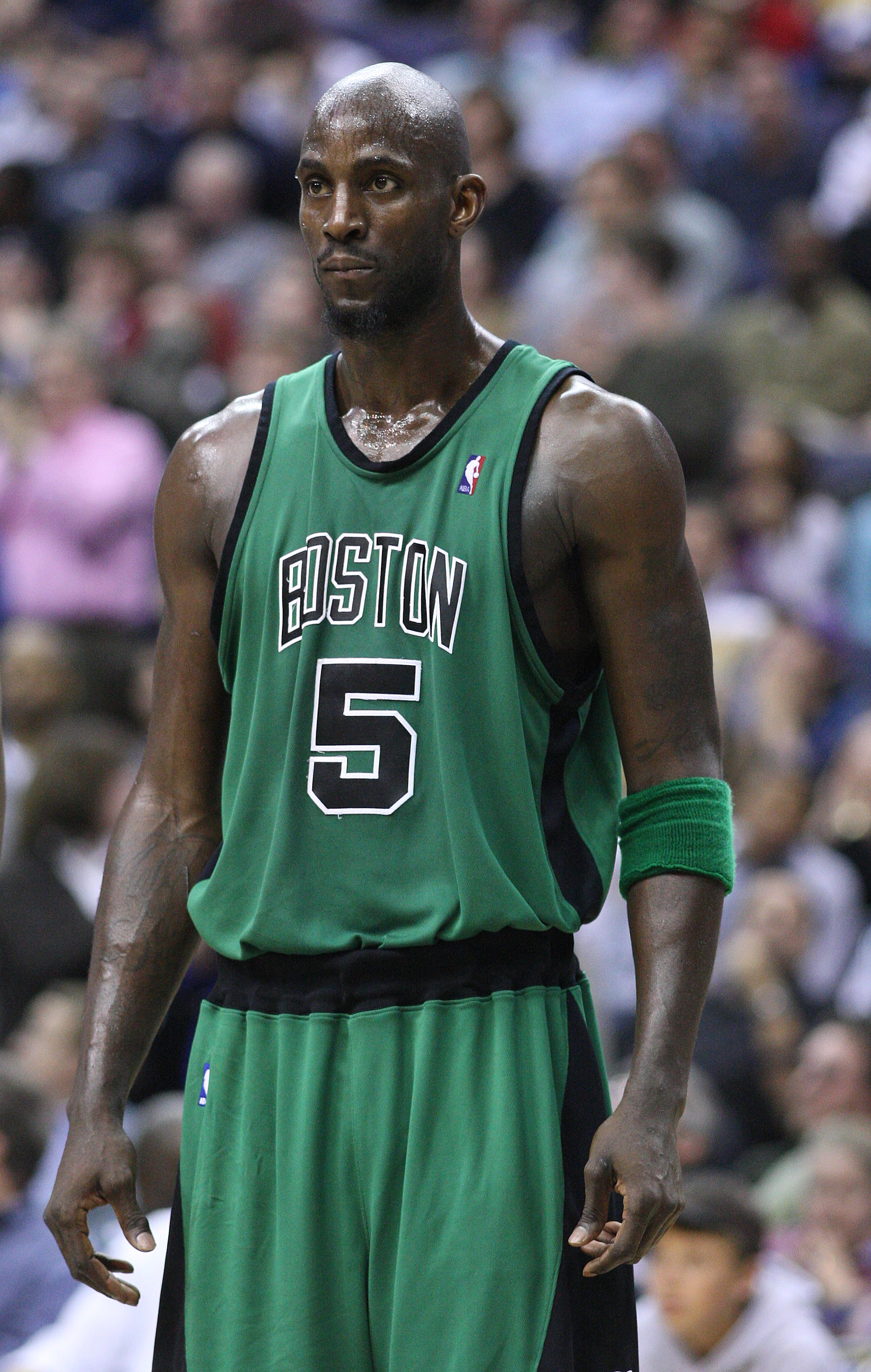
Kevin Garnett

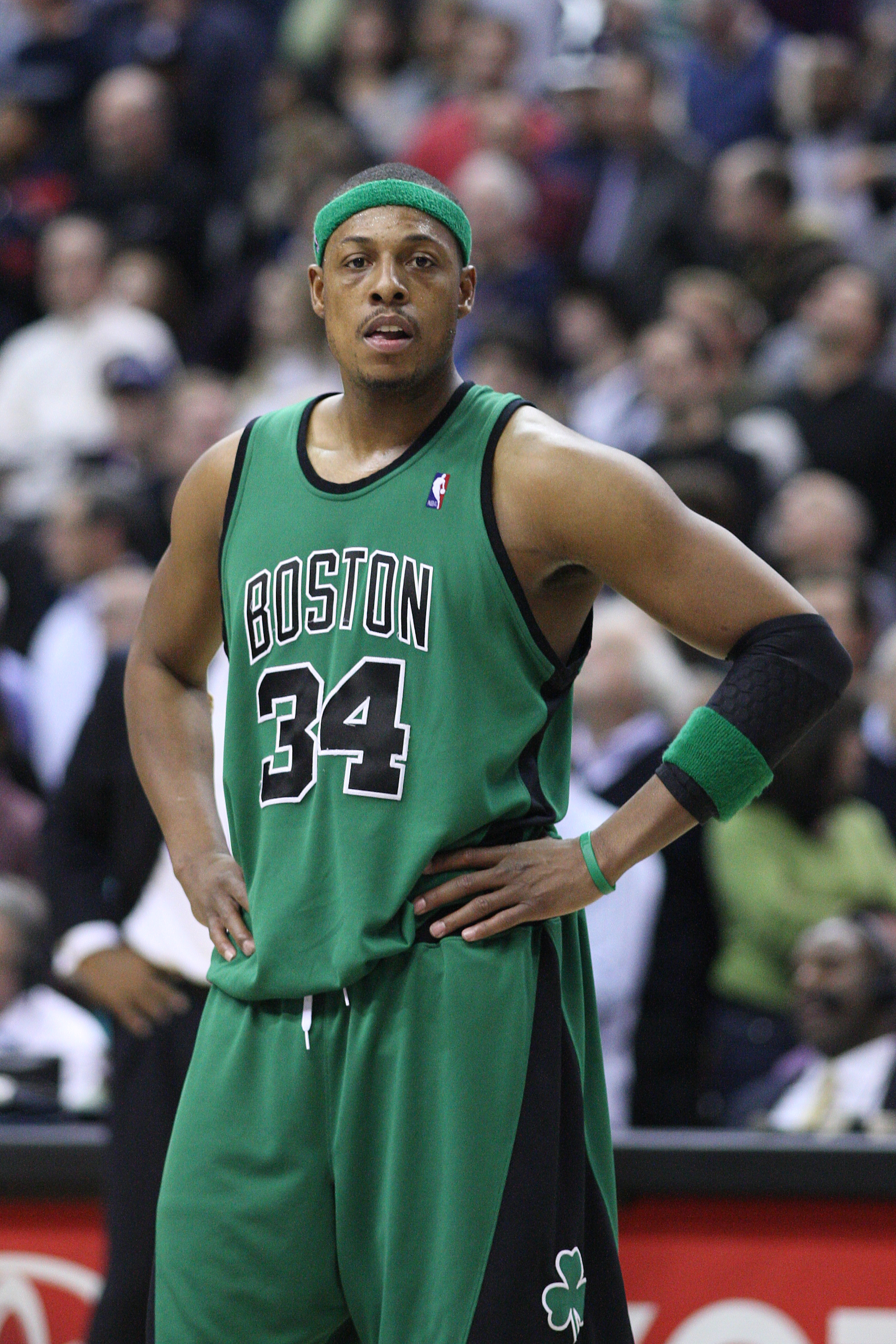
Paul Pierce

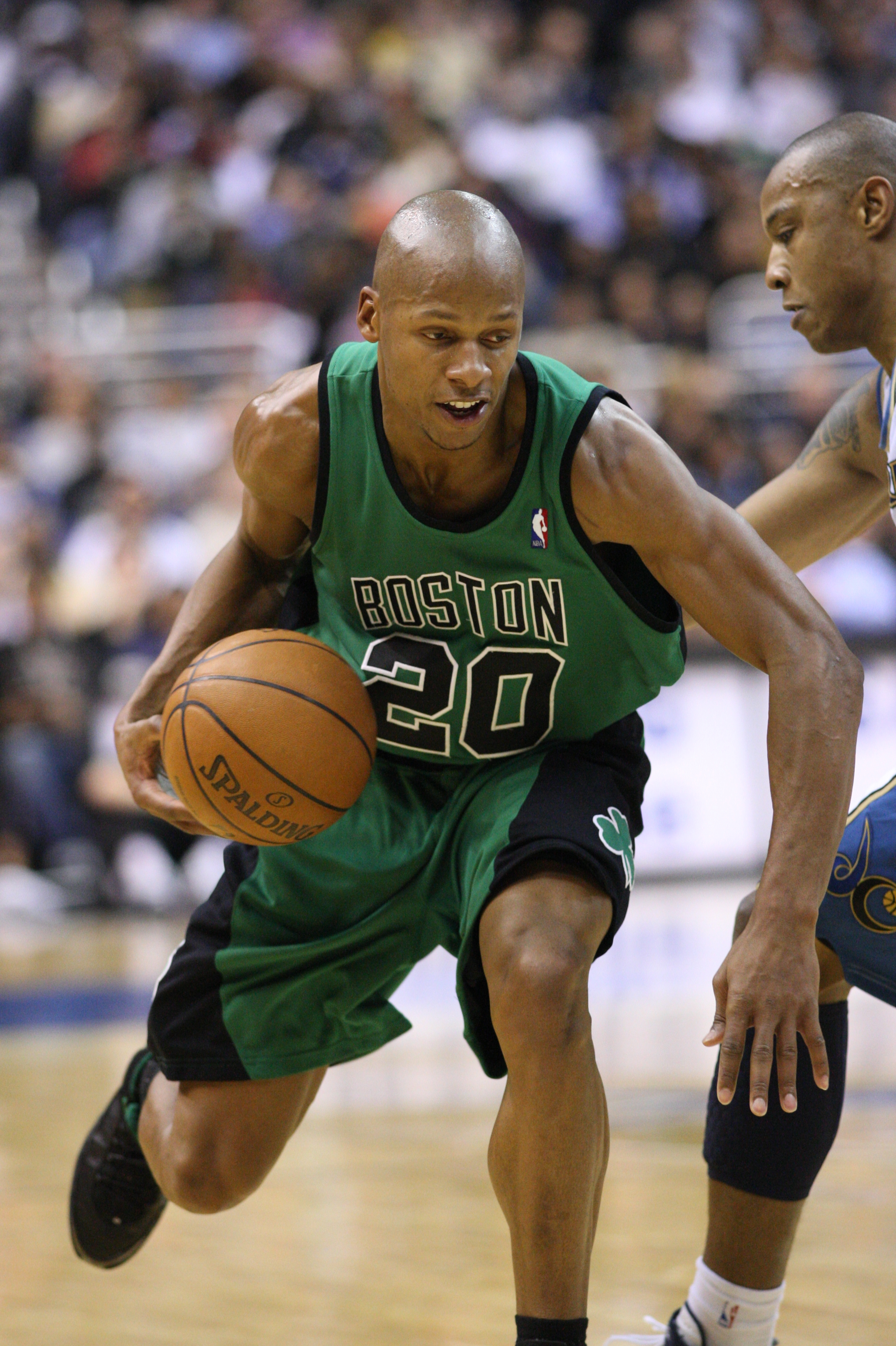
Ray Allen

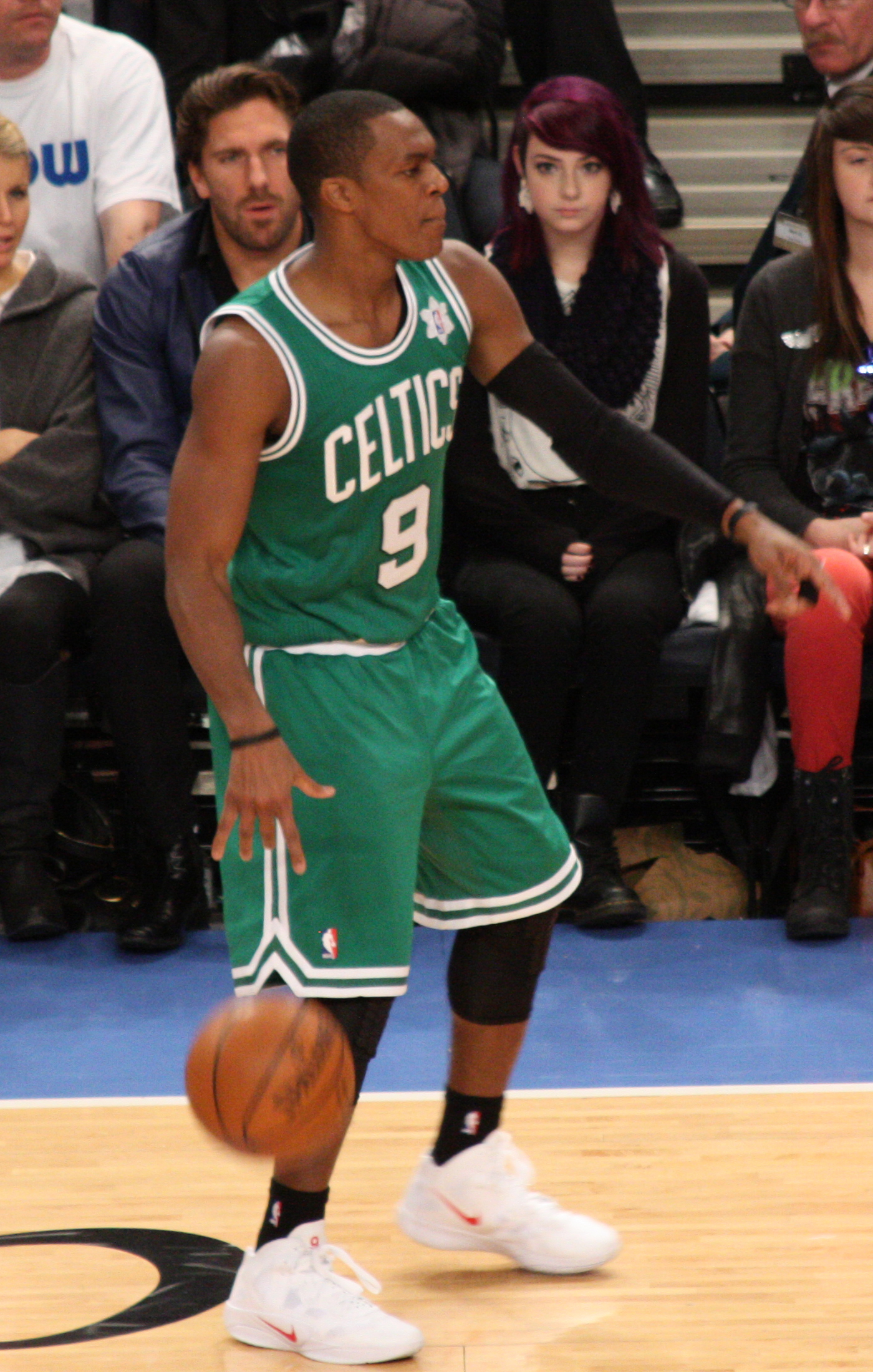
Rajon Rondo

Following a lackluster 2006–2007 season, finishing 24–58, the Celtics sought a new move to propel them to the top of the league. During the summer of 2007, Danny Ainge made two different blockbuster moves. First, on the night of the 2007 NBA draft, he traded No. 5 pick Jeff Green, Wally Szczerbiak and Delonte West to Seattle for perennial all-star Ray Allen and Seattle's second-round pick (which the team used to select LSU's Glen "Big Baby" Davis). The Celtics then traded Ryan Gomes, Gerald Green, Al Jefferson, Theo Ratliff, Sebastian Telfair, and a first-round draft pick to the Timberwolves in exchange for superstar power forward Kevin Garnett on July 31, 2007. These moves created a new "Big Three" of Pierce, Allen, and Garnett." This new "Big Three" created the most drastic record changes in NBA history seeing them finish 66-16 for the season en route to the 2008 NBA championship. The Celtics later returned to the NBA Finals in 2010 under a new "Big Four" with Rajon Rondo starting to become established as a star player for the Celtics himself, but they ultimately fell in 7 games to their longtime rival Lakers. They narrowly fell to eventual 2012 NBA champions Miami Heat in the Eastern conference finals, having been ahead at 3 games to 2. Kevin Garnett and Paul Pierce afterwards were traded to the newly established Brooklyn Nets and Ray Allen left to join the Miami Heat, the very team that ended theirs.

=== 2010–2014: Miami Heat ===
Miami Heat superteam

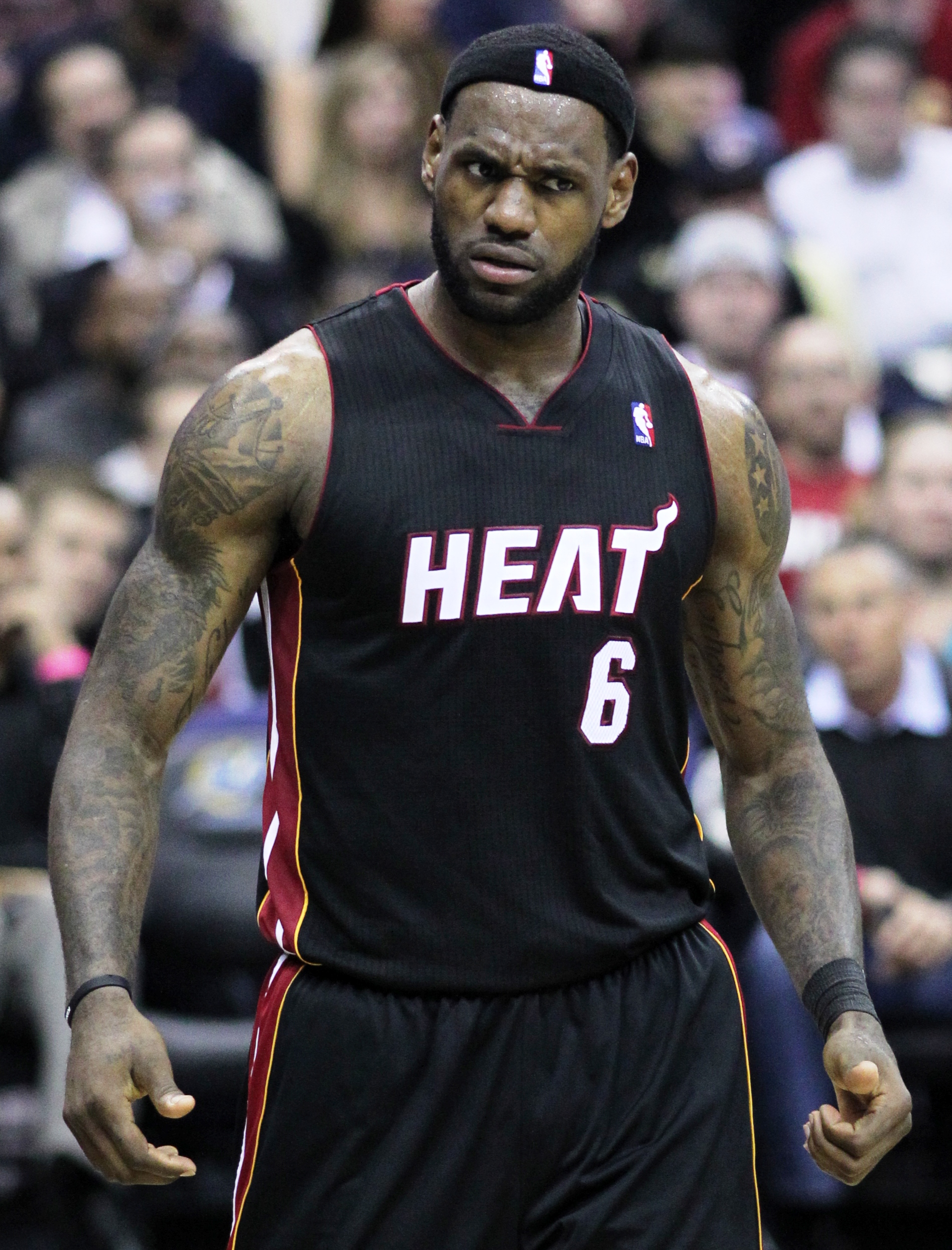
LeBron James

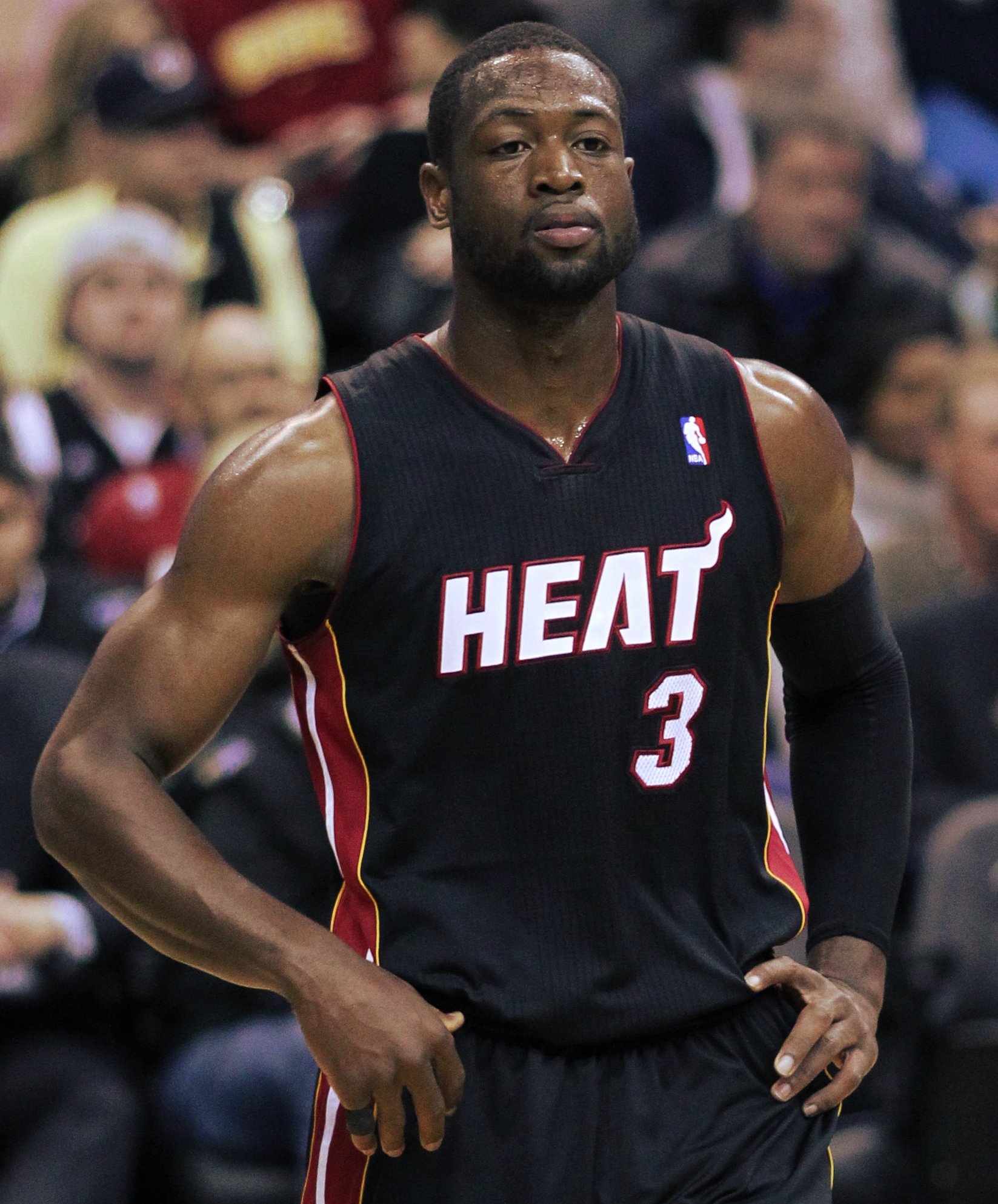
Dwyane Wade

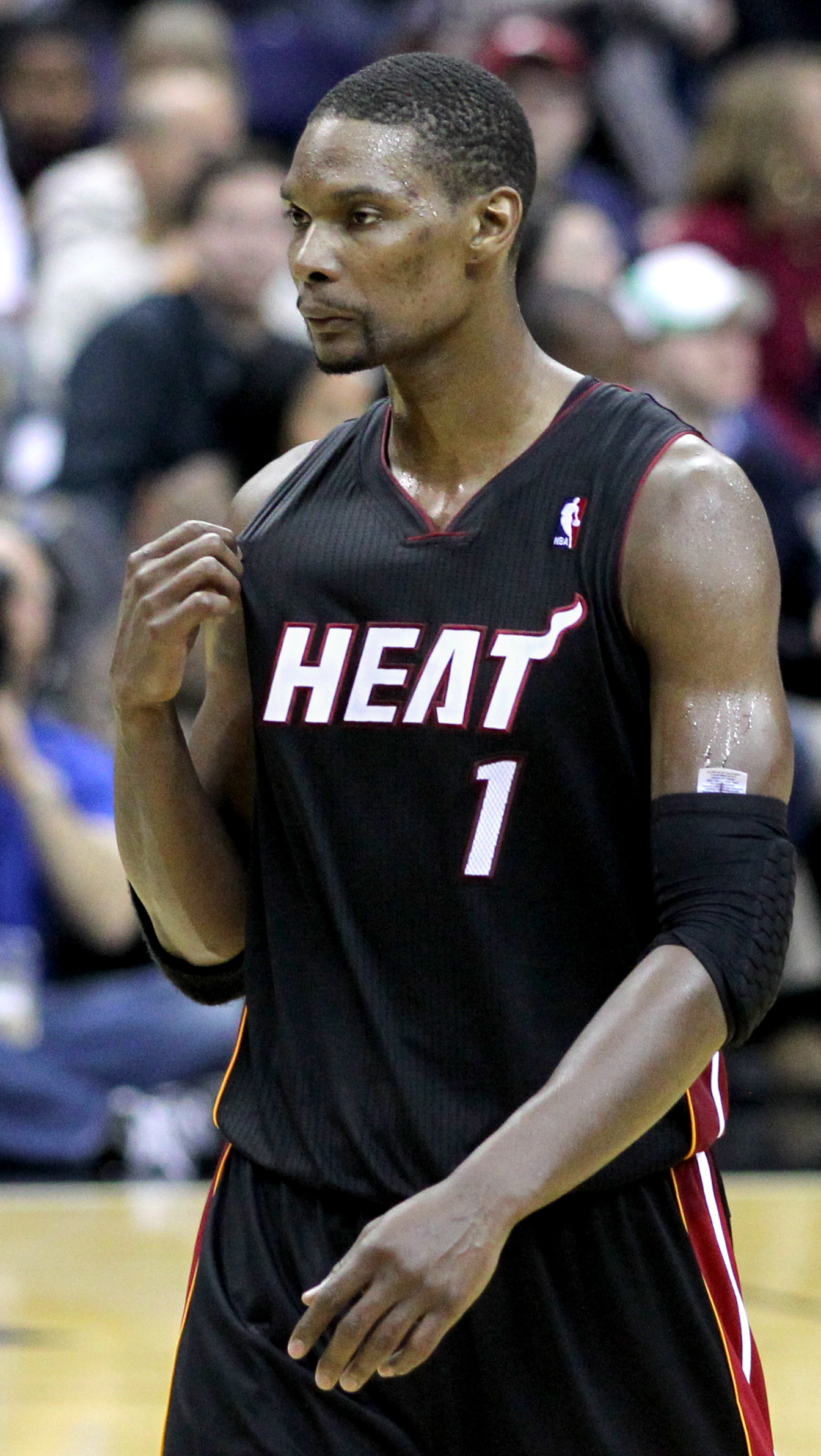
Chris Bosh

On July 8, 2010, two-time NBA MVP LeBron James announced his free agency decision on a live ESPN broadcast titled The Decision, joining the Miami Heat and Dwyane Wade. Shortly afterward, All-Star Chris Bosh signed with Heat, uniting three of the first five picks of the lauded 2003 NBA draft on one team. The Heat superteam were expected to immediately compete for the championship, with James himself proclaiming the team would win eight titles. The 2010–11 Miami Heat finished the regular season with a record of 58-24, claiming the #2 seed in the Eastern Conference. After breezing through the Eastern Conference playoffs, they stunningly lost a 4-2 series in the 2011 NBA Finals against the Dallas Mavericks, one of the biggest upsets in NBA Finals history.

Following this setback, the 2011–12 Miami Heat finished 46-20 in a lockout-shortened season. The team overcame a 3-2 deficit to win in 7 games in a tight series against the Boston Celtics before taking down a young Oklahoma City Thunder team 4-1 to obtain their first championship together. On July 11, 2012, the Heat signed Ray Allen, adding one of the greatest three-point shooters in NBA history while simultaneously weakening their primary rival, the Boston Celtics. Despite his advanced age and a diminished role, Allen proved to be instrumental in the team's second consecutive championship in the 2013 NBA Finals, hitting a key shot that ultimately helped overcome the San Antonio Spurs in Game 6, with the team eventually winning the series 4–3. During this same season, the Heat also achieved 27 straight regular season victories from February 3 to March 25, 2013, the second-longest win streak in NBA history. In the 2014 Finals, the Heat lost to the Spurs in 5 games in a rematch of the previous Finals. Following the loss, LeBron James reentered free agency and returned to his hometown Cleveland Cavaliers, ending the Miami "Big Three".

Multiple NBA players and analysts have pointed to James's free agency and the Miami Heat superteam as being the catalyst for the leaguewide explosion in superteams over the following years.

=== 2014–2017: Cleveland Cavaliers ===
Cleveland Cavaliers superteam

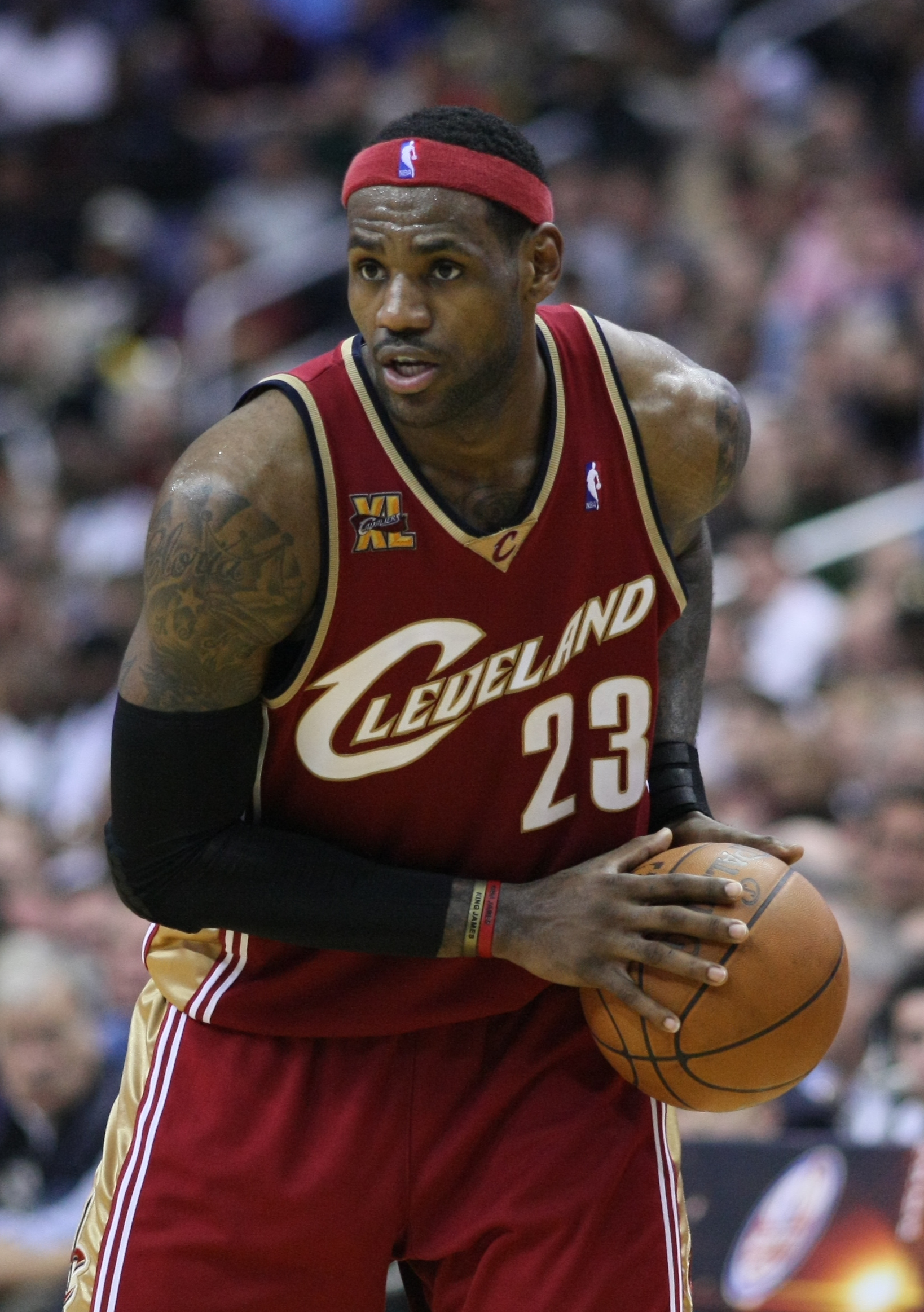
LeBron James

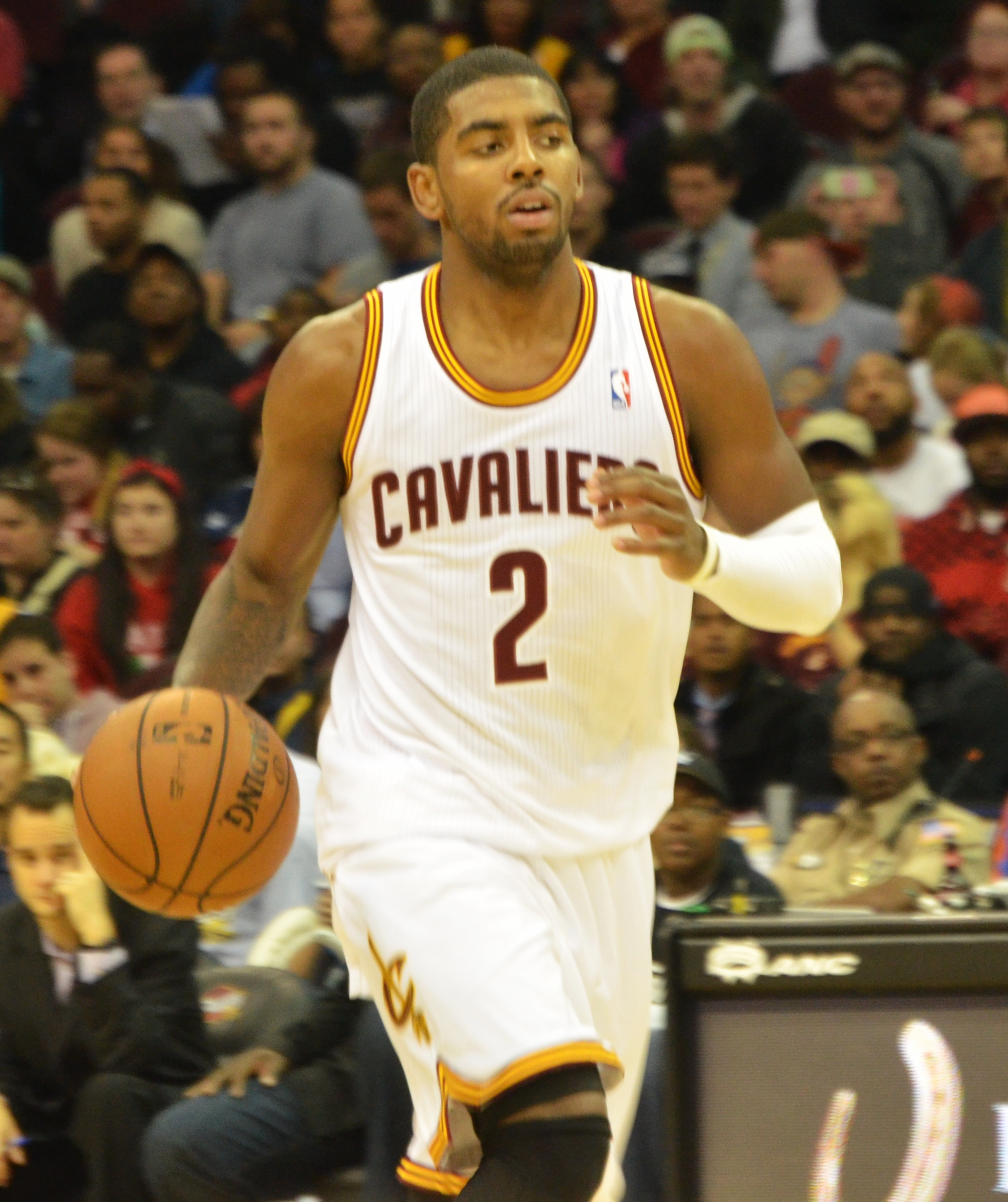
Kyrie Irving

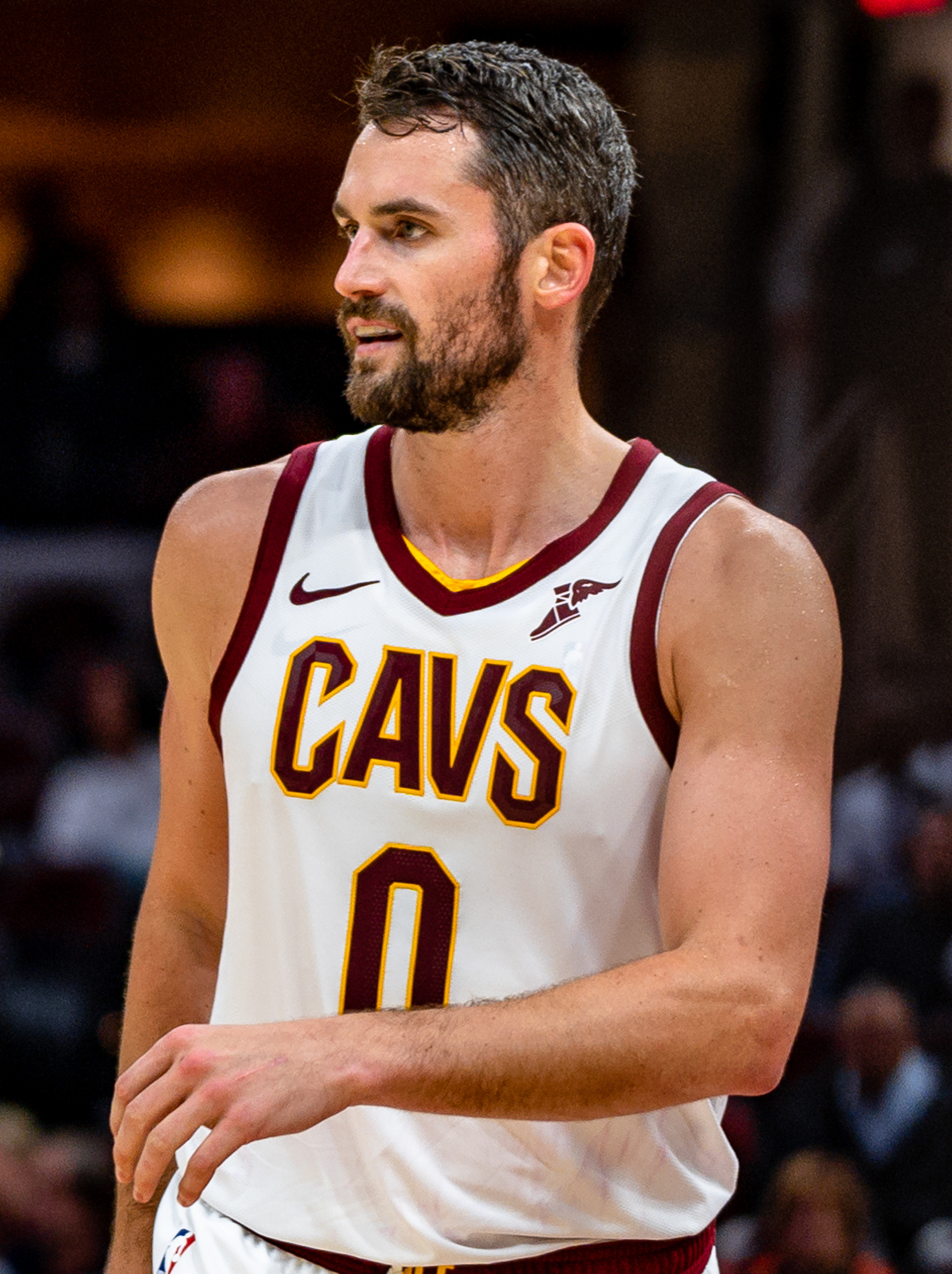
Kevin Love

The Cleveland Cavaliers were awarded the #1 pick of the 2011 NBA draft when a draft pick acquired from a trade with the Los Angeles Clippers won the draft lottery. The team selected Duke point guard Kyrie Irving, who soon became an NBA All-Star. LeBron James signed as a free agent on July 12, 2014, reuniting with his former team. A month later, on August 23, Minnesota Timberwolves power forward Kevin Love was acquired in a three-team trade for Anthony Bennett and Andrew Wiggins, who had been selected first overall by the Cavaliers in the 2013 and 2014 NBA Drafts, respectively. During their first season together, the team saw immediate success with a 53–29 record to finish second in Eastern Conference. The Cavaliers advanced to the NBA Finals for the second time franchise history, but untimely injuries to Love and Irving played a part in a 4–2 series loss to the Golden State Warriors.

Despite starting the following season with a 30–11 record, the Cavaliers fired head coach David Blatt and replaced him with assistant coach Tyronn Lue for the remainder of the season, obtaining the first seed in the Eastern Conference. The team cruised through the Eastern Conference playoffs to set up a rematch with Golden State in the 2016 NBA Finals. The Cavaliers initially struggled in the series, going down 3–1 against a Warriors team that set the mark for the best regular season record in NBA history at 73–9. However, after winning Games 5 & 6, the Cavaliers triumphed in a low-scoring Game 7 that featured a timely block by LeBron James and a celebrated three-point shot by Kyrie Irving to bring the Cavaliers their first ever NBA Finals championship, completing the first 3-1 comeback in NBA Finals history. This championship is considered the end of the 52-year citywide Cleveland sports curse.

After their title success, the Cavaliers completed their first full season under Lue with a 51–31 record. Despite a less successful regular season campaign, the Cavaliers still achieved a 12-1 record in the Eastern Conference Playoffs and third straight NBA Finals appearance. However, the Warriors new superteam with Kevin Durant completed a commanding 4–1 series victory. During the following offseason, Irving demanded a trade out of Cleveland and was later sent to the rival Boston Celtics in exchange for Isaiah Thomas, Jae Crowder, Ante Žižić, and a 2018 first round draft pick (that ultimately turned into Collin Sexton). In the face of Irving's absence, the Cavaliers still managed their fourth straight NBA Finals appearance. Facing the Golden State Warriors in the Finals for the fourth year in row, the Cavaliers suffered their third defeat in four seasons, this time being swept 4–0. LeBron James subsequently left the Cavaliers to join the Los Angeles Lakers in 2018, ending his second stint with Cleveland.

=== 2016–2019: Golden State Warriors ===
Golden State Warriors superteam

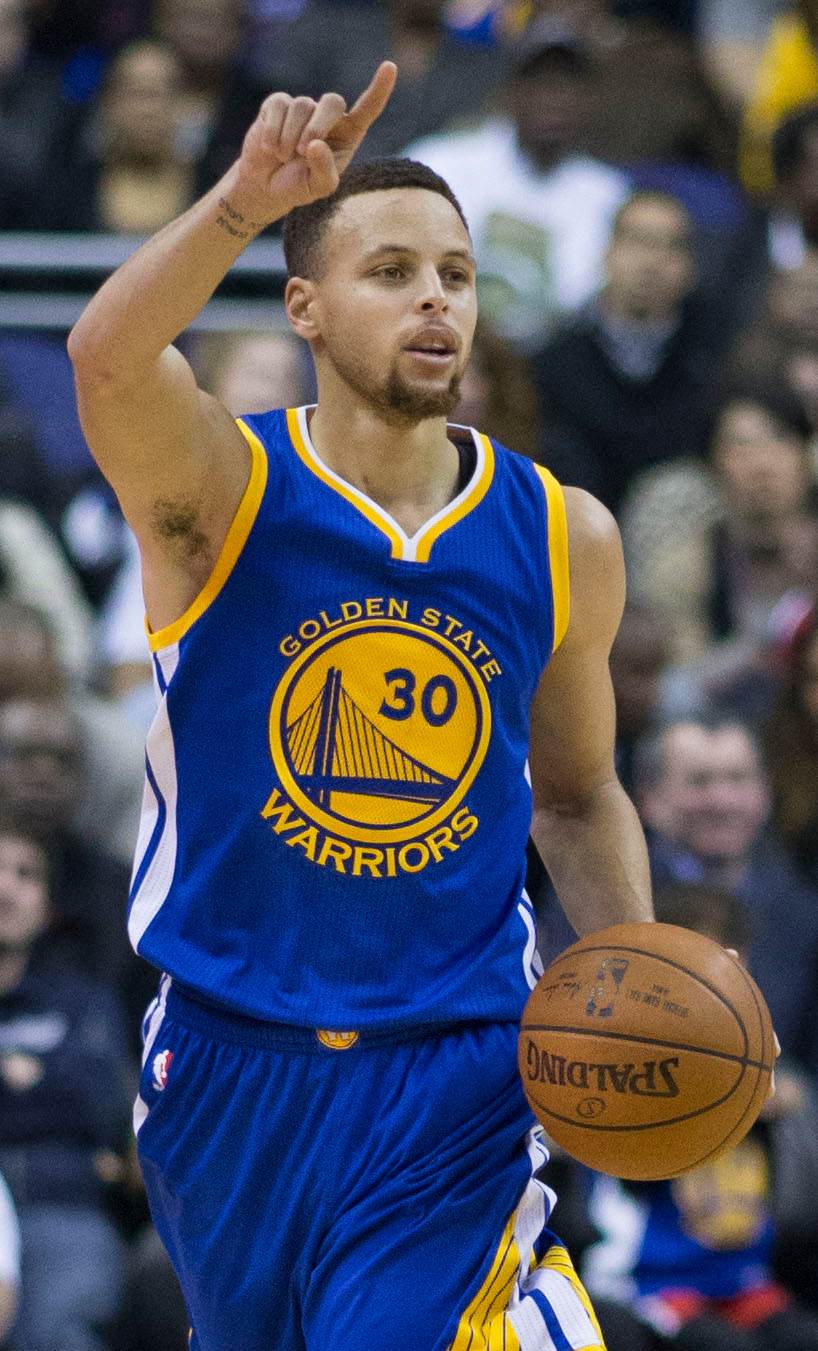
Stephen Curry

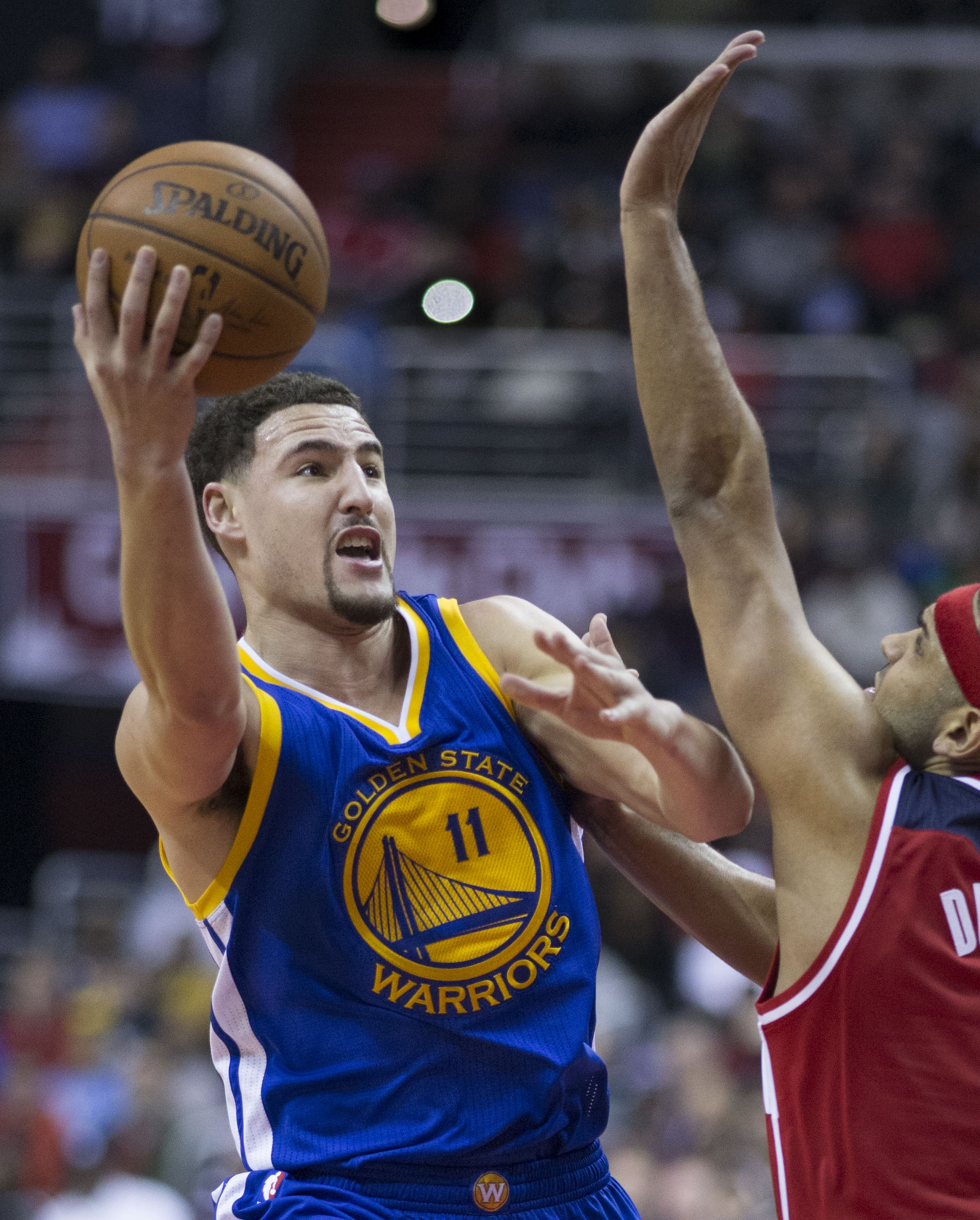
Klay Thompson

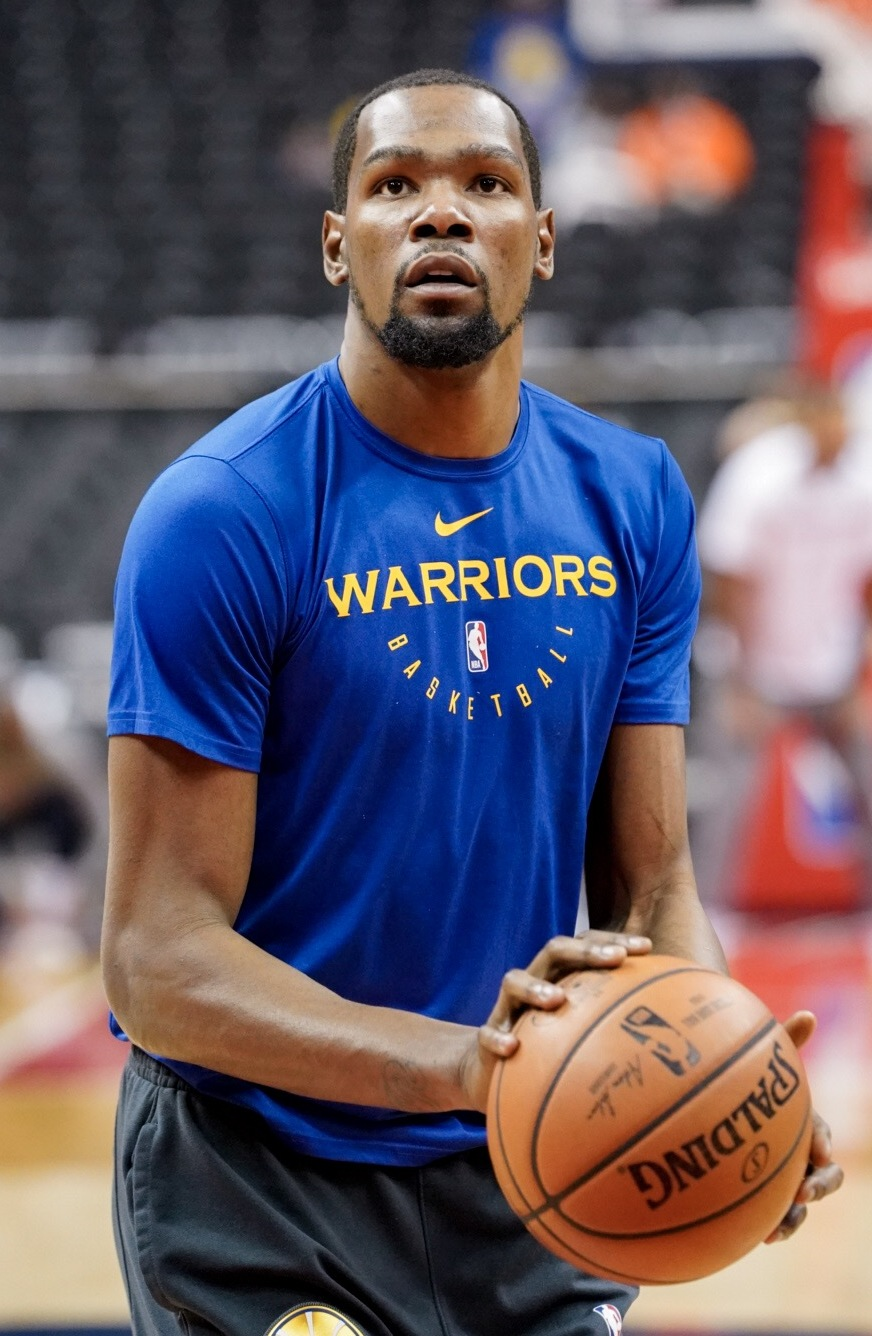
Kevin Durant

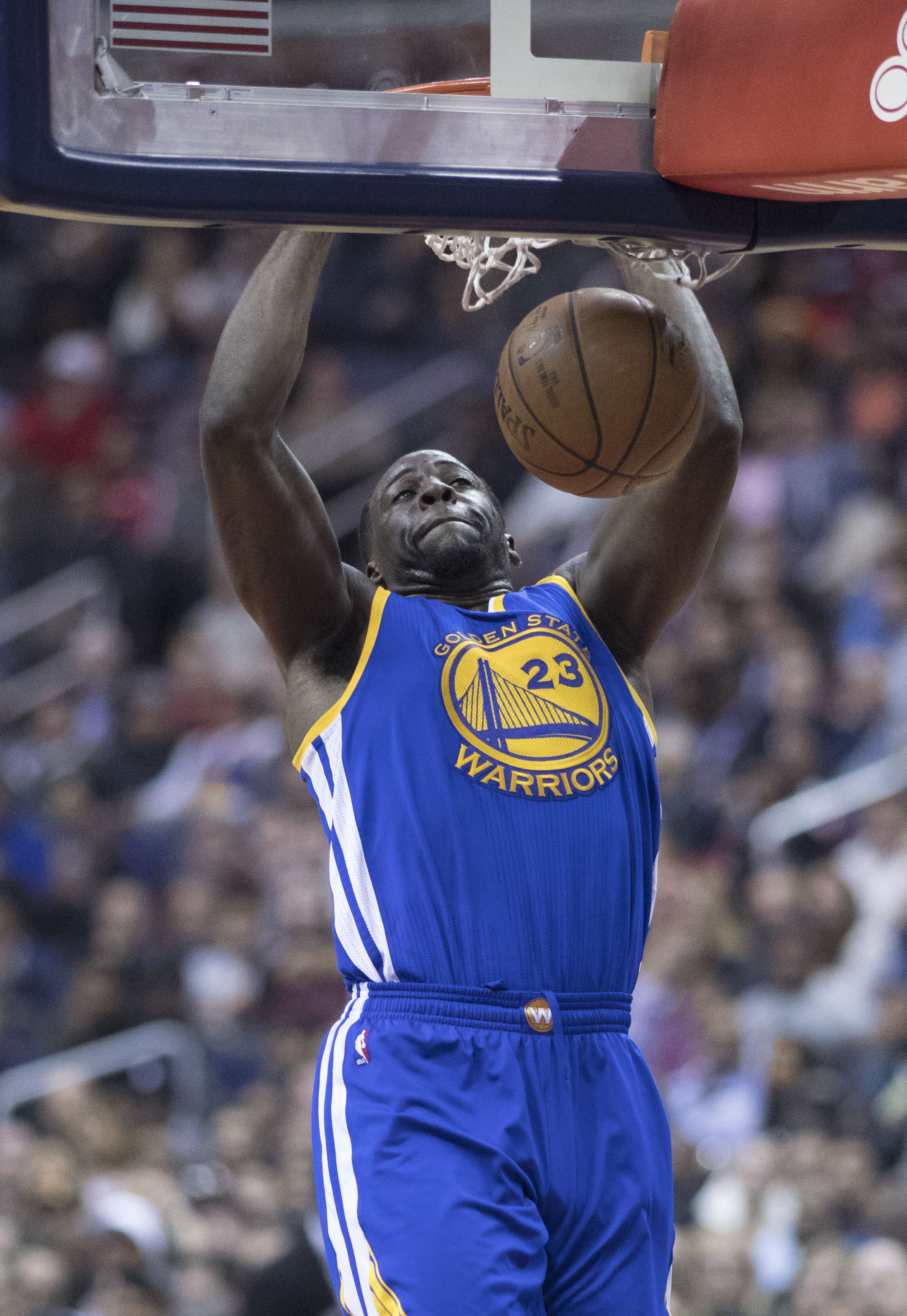
Draymond Green

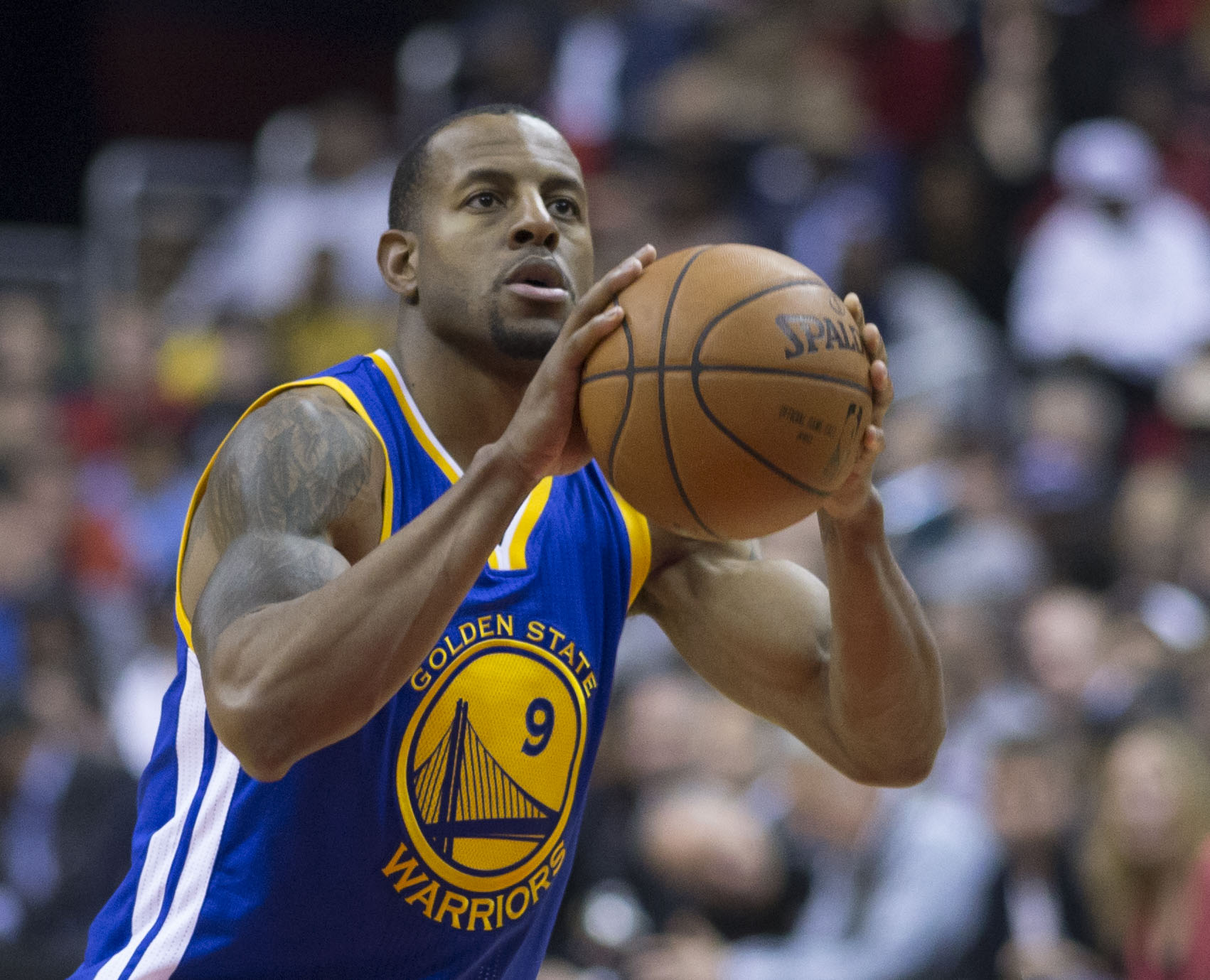
Andre Iguodala

In the 2016 offseason, after blowing a 3–1 lead to the Cavaliers in the 2016 Finals, the Warriors made a move to re-assert their spot as the most dominant franchise in the league by acquiring former MVP Kevin Durant in free agency, who had himself been a part of the Thunder team that lost a 3–1 series lead in the Western Conference Finals against the same Warriors. Before the playoffs, the Warriors matched or broke several NBA records. They reclaimed the top seed with 67 wins, won the most ever games by a 40-point-plus margin, and extended their run of most games without back-to-back losses in the regular season to 146 (spanning from April 9, 2015, to March 2, 2017). They tied the record for most players in the All-Star game with 4 (Durant, Stephen Curry, Klay Thompson, and Draymond Green). In the postseason, the Warriors broke the records for best start (15–0), longest win streak (15), and best overall record (16–1). They swept the Western Conference Playoffs 12–0 before eliminating the Cavaliers in the Finals in 5 games.

In 2018, the Warriors were unable to reclaim the league's best record after 3 straight years of doing so. They eliminated the San Antonio Spurs and the New Orleans Pelicans each in 5 games before narrowly beating the 1st-seeded Houston Rockets in 7 games in the Western Conference Finals. They swept the 2018 Finals over Cleveland to win a second straight title, and 3 titles in 4 years. In the 2018 offseason, the Warriors signed DeMarcus Cousins as a free agent. The Warriors became the first franchise in 42 years to be able to start five All-Stars from the previous season at each floor position. The Warriors reclaimed the 1st seed in the Western Conference with a 57–25 record and made it to their 5th straight NBA Finals. However, they lost the 2019 Finals in 6 games to the Toronto Raptors led by Kawhi Leonard. The Warriors were plagued by injuries, with Kevin Durant missing playoff games with a calf injury and an Achilles tear, and Klay Thompson suffering hamstring and ACL injuries in the Finals. In the 2019 offseason, Durant joined the Brooklyn Nets in a sign-and-trade deal. However, the Warriors without Durant and Cousins did win another NBA Finals championship in 2022 with their originally drafted Big Three of Curry, Thompson, and Green before the Warriors eventually announced the breakup of the Splash Brothers and their original Big Three on July 1, 2024 by saying Klay Thompson would not return to the team.

== Other notable examples ==
=== 1998–1999: Houston Rockets ===
Houston Rockets superteam

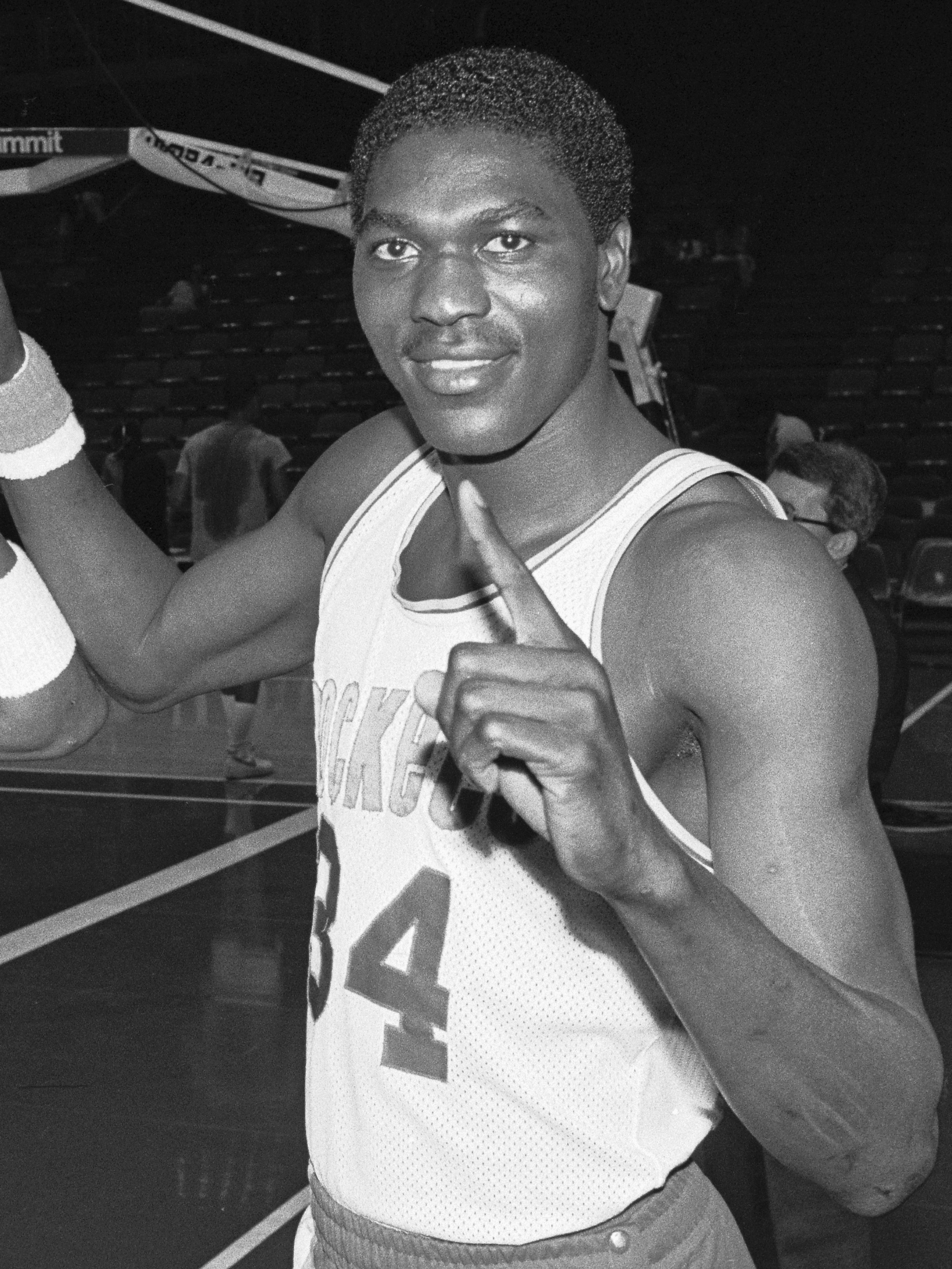
Hakeem Olajuwon

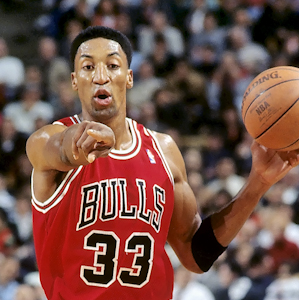
Scottie Pippen

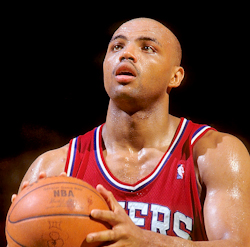
Charles Barkley

A few seasons before the 1998–99 season began, the Houston Rockets won back-to-back NBA titles in 1994 and 1995 behind franchise cornerstone Hakeem Olajuwon, alongside his former college teammate Clyde Drexler. Afterward, the Rockets were eliminated by the Seattle SuperSonics in 1996. The following season, Houston traded for Charles Barkley from the Phoenix Suns. Barkley, a future Hall of Fame power forward, helped the Rockets eliminate the favored Sonics in the Western Conference Semifinals before falling to the Utah Jazz in the Western Conference Finals. The next season, after finishing with a mediocre 41–41 record and an aging roster, the Rockets once again faced the Jazz, this time in the first round, and were eliminated in five games. Following the disappointing first-round exit, Rockets shooting guard Clyde Drexler decided to retire after three productive seasons with Houston. In need of another star player, the team acquired Scottie Pippen from the Chicago Bulls following his "Last Dance" with the Bulls and the franchise’s sixth championship. Pippen, disgruntled over being underpaid in prior years, signed a five-year, $67.2 million contract. Charles Barkley took a $1.2 million pay cut to help make the move possible. The Rockets’ season began during the strike-shortened 1998–99 campaign, which consisted of only 50 games. They finished with a 31–19 record, but the team was eliminated in the first round by Shaquille O’Neal, Kobe Bryant, and the Los Angeles Lakers in five games. Despite a solid regular season, internal issues and poor team chemistry became apparent. Pippen questioned Barkley’s work ethic, echoing criticisms previously made by Pippen's former Bulls teammate Michael Jordan. In an interview with Frank Isola, Pippen said: "I thought I was joining a super team [...] But it just didn’t work out. We didn’t have the right chemistry and we were aging a little bit. I felt like it wasn’t a good fit for me. [...] I didn’t realize Charles wasn’t as dedicated as I thought he would be. I mean, I went to Houston to help Charles Barkley win a championship. I just felt his dedication wasn’t there once I got there". He also argued that Hakeem Olajuwon was already in decline. A few months later, Pippen was traded to the Portland Trail Blazers.

=== 2003–2004: Los Angeles Lakers ===
Los Angeles Lakers superteam

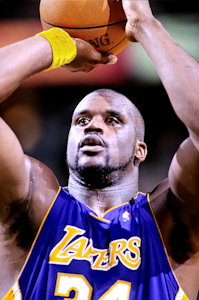
Shaquille O'Neal

Kobe Bryant

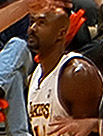
Karl Malone

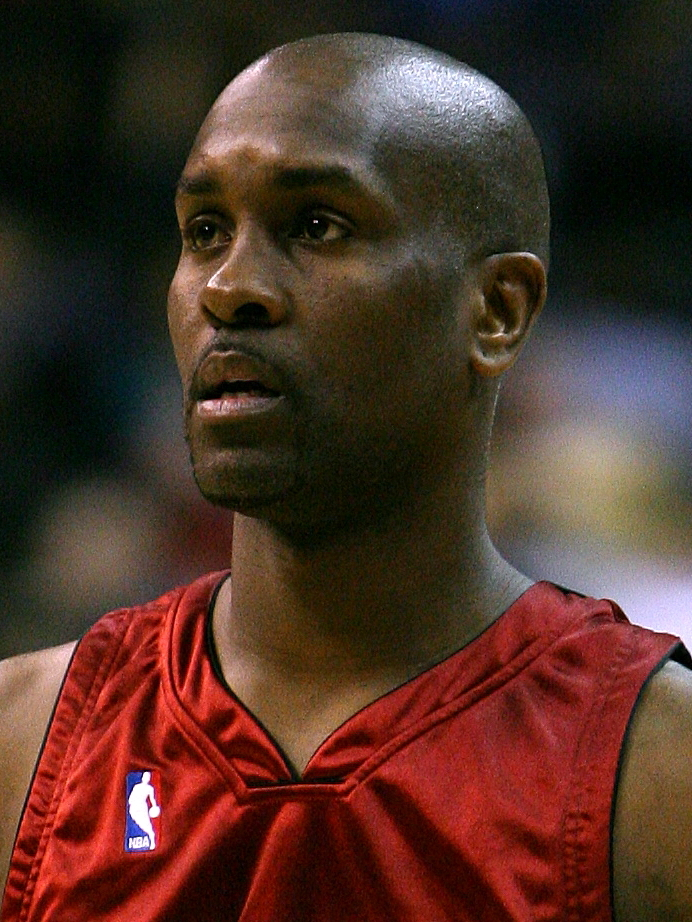
Gary Payton

The Lakers, led by Kobe Bryant and Shaquille O'Neal, had won three consecutive titles from 2000 to 2002. They failed to win a fourth straight in 2003 after losing to the eventual champion San Antonio Spurs in the Western Conference Semifinals. The 2003–04 Lakers signed Gary Payton and Karl Malone, who were both seeking their first NBA championship. Instead of improving significantly, the Lakers suffered through locker room troubles the entire season. O'Neal unsuccessfully demanded a new contract, while Bryant missed several games due to a sexual assault trial. O’Neal, Bryant, and Malone also suffered injuries throughout the season. Kobe Bryant's wife, Vanessa Bryant, accused Karl Malone of sexual harassment, which continued to make headlines in the following years, also caused further strain within the team. Despite these challenges, the Lakers returned to the NBA Finals, only to lose the championship series 4–1 against the defensive-oriented Detroit Pistons in possibly the biggest upset in NBA Finals history. After the series loss, the team was dismantled: coach Phil Jackson resigned (but eventually returned to the position a year later), Malone retired, and O'Neal and Payton were traded, with both later winning a title together with the Miami Heat in 2006.

=== 2012–2013: Los Angeles Lakers ===
Los Angeles Lakers superteam

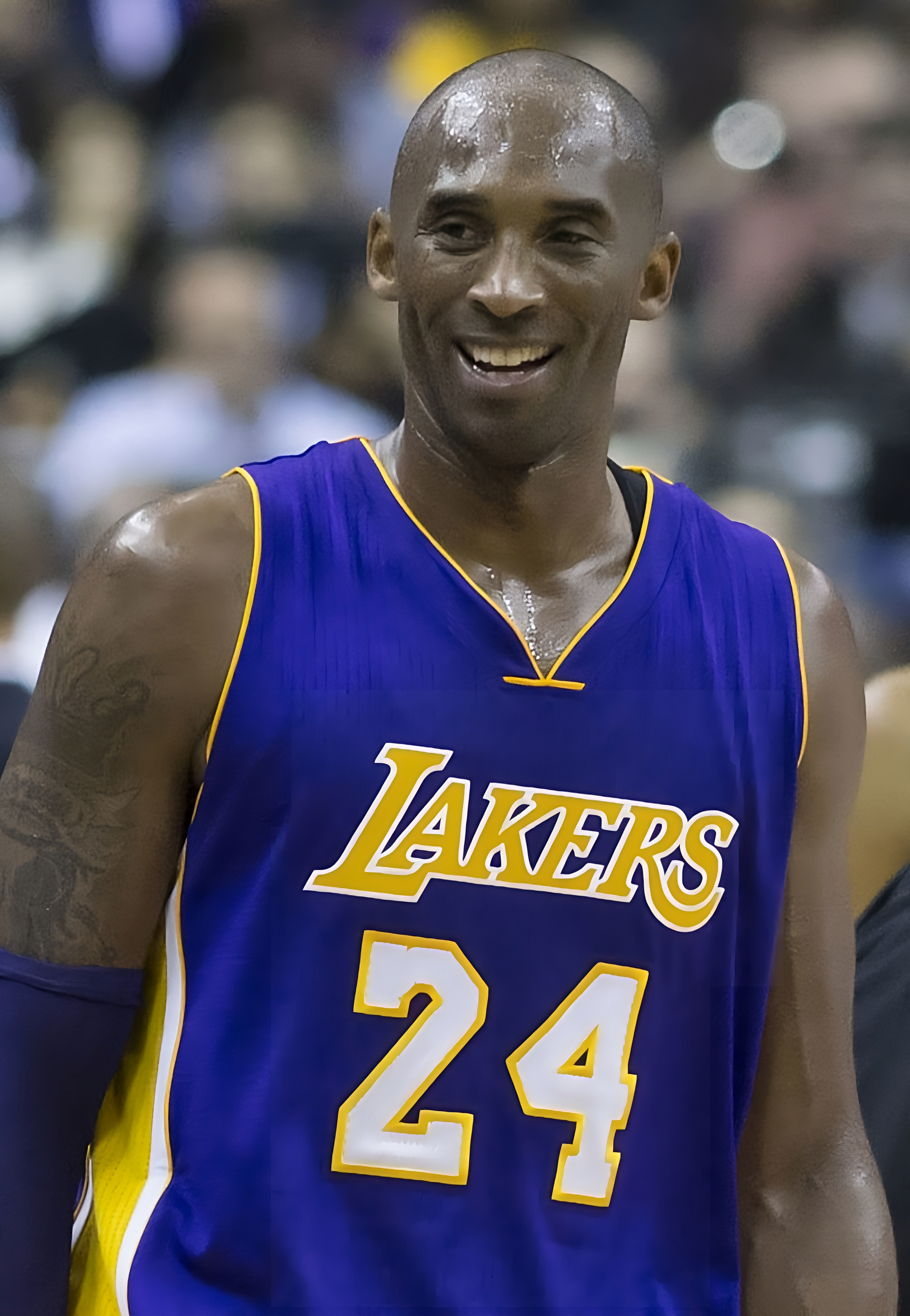
Kobe Bryant

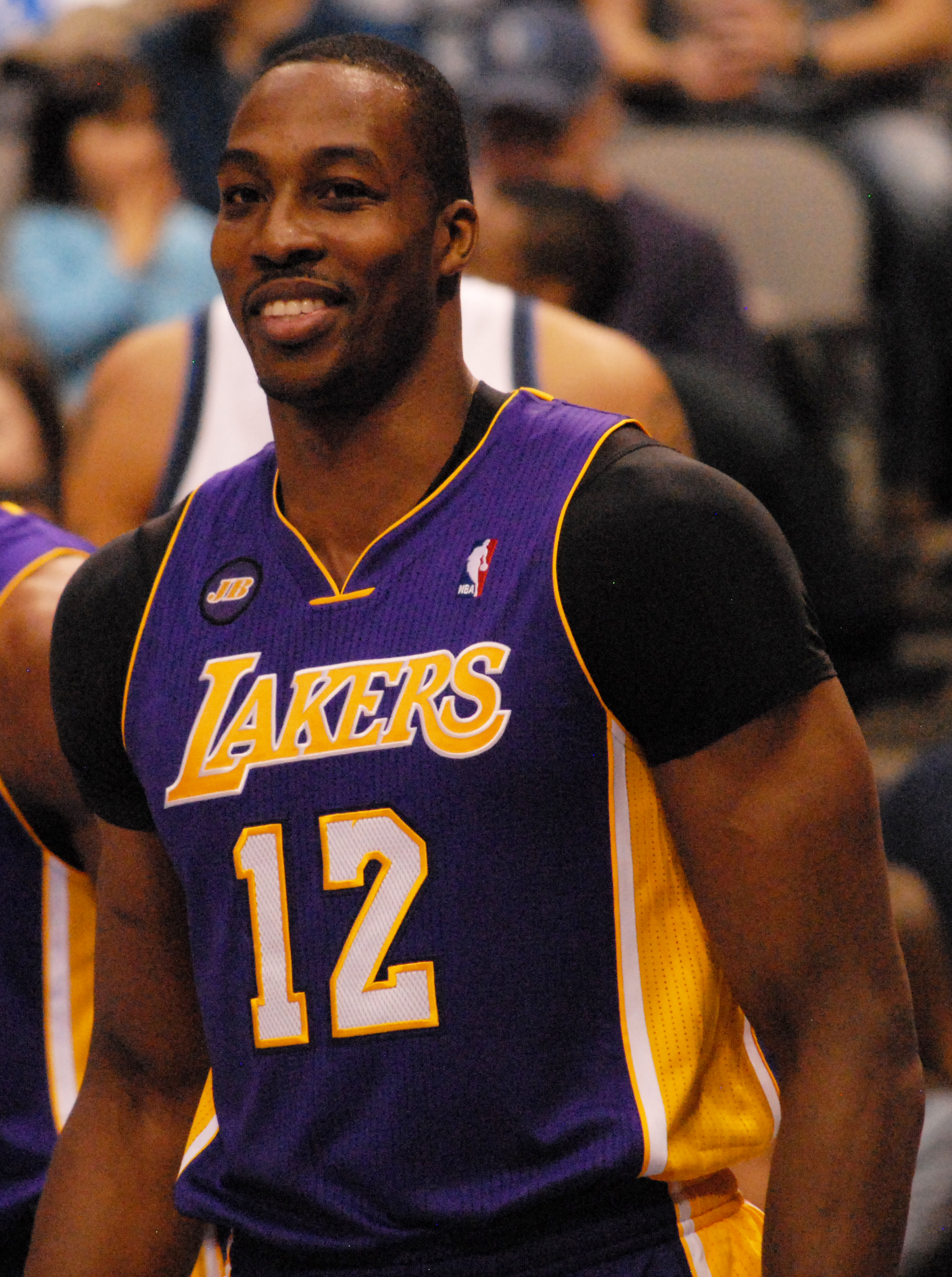
Dwight Howard

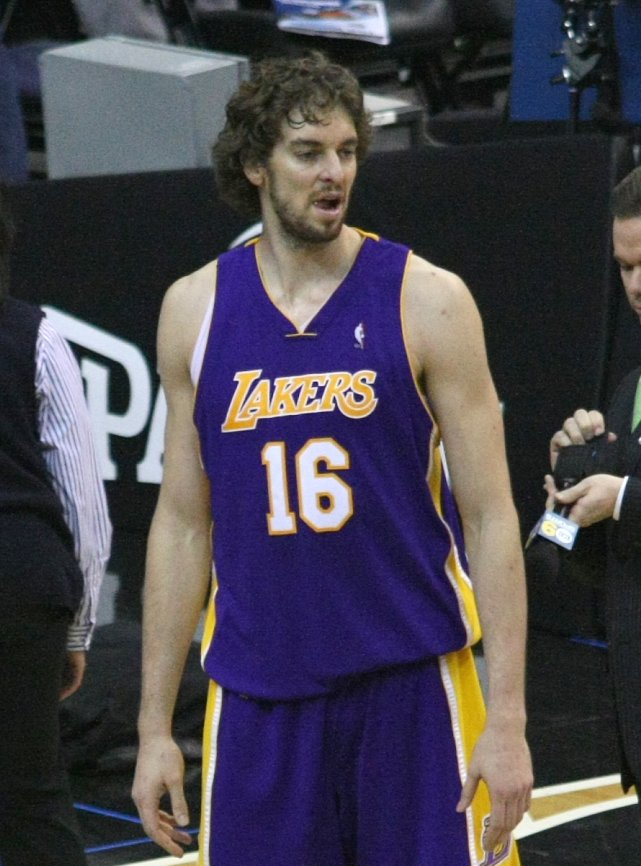
Pau Gasol

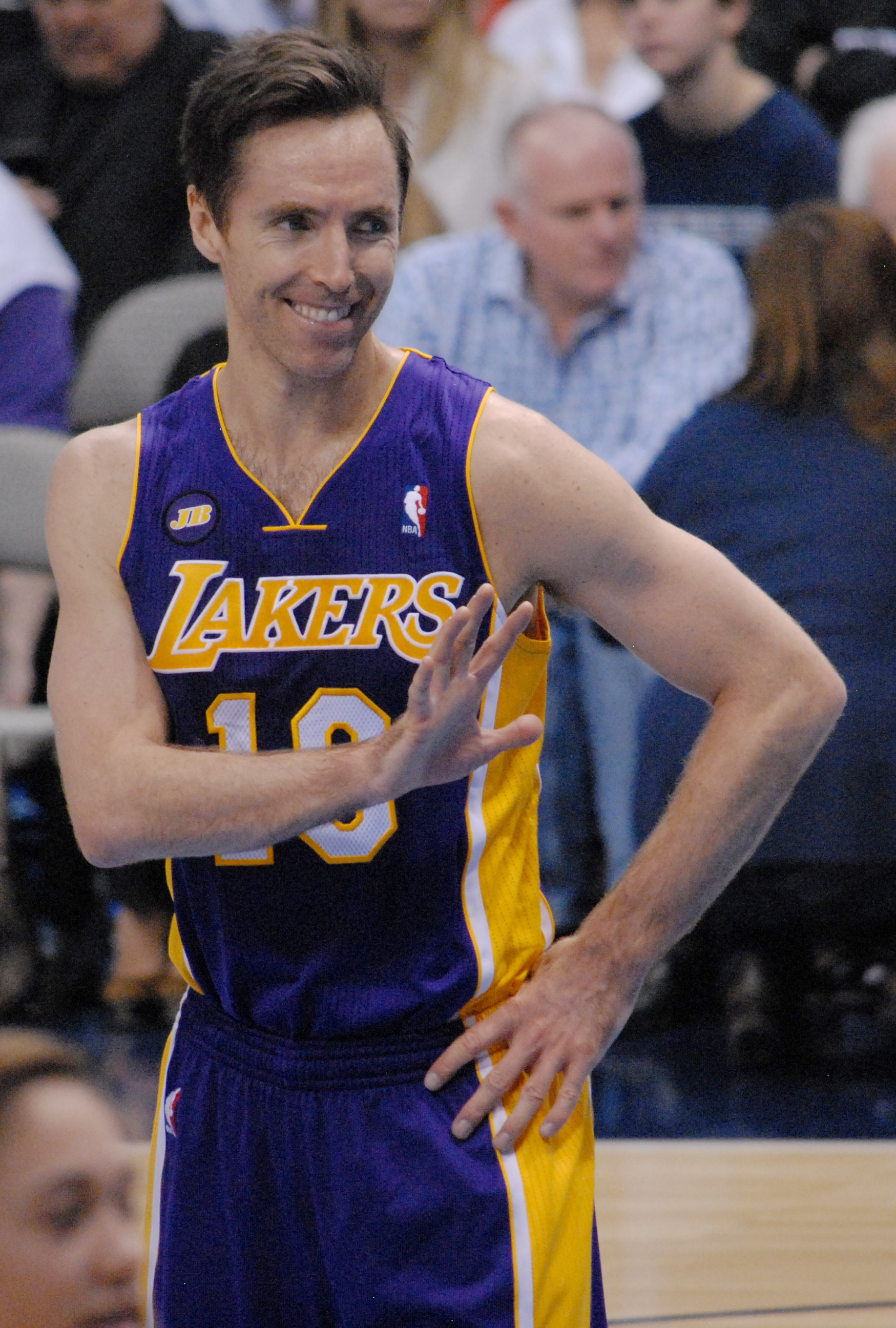
Steve Nash

On July 11, 2012, Steve Nash was traded by the Phoenix Suns to the Lakers. On August 10, 2012, Dwight Howard was traded by the Orlando Magic to the Lakers in a 4-team trade, pairing them with Kobe Bryant and Pau Gasol. The Lakers dealt with multiple injuries throughout the season. Howard took six months off from basketball after his April back surgery, and only had the combined four weeks of training camp and preseason to prepare for the season. Still working himself into shape, Howard paced himself throughout the season on both offense and defense. On October 31, 2012, two games into his Lakers career, Steve Nash broke his leg after a collision with Damian Lillard of the Portland Trail Blazers, and was out of the lineup for close to seven weeks. Nash said in The Players' Tribune, "I broke my leg and nothing was the same." On February 18, 2013, Lakers owner Jerry Buss died from kidney failure, leaving ownership of the team to his family's estate. On April 12, 2013, Bryant tore his Achilles, limiting him to only 41 games over the following two years. The Lakers finished with a 45–37 record and were swept in the first round by the San Antonio Spurs. Howard then chose to sign as a free agent with the Houston Rockets. During the 2013–14 NBA season, the team missed the playoffs entirely. Pau Gasol signed with the Chicago Bulls during the 2014 offseason while Steve Nash retired during the middle of the following season.

=== 2013–2014: Brooklyn Nets ===
Brooklyn Nets superteam

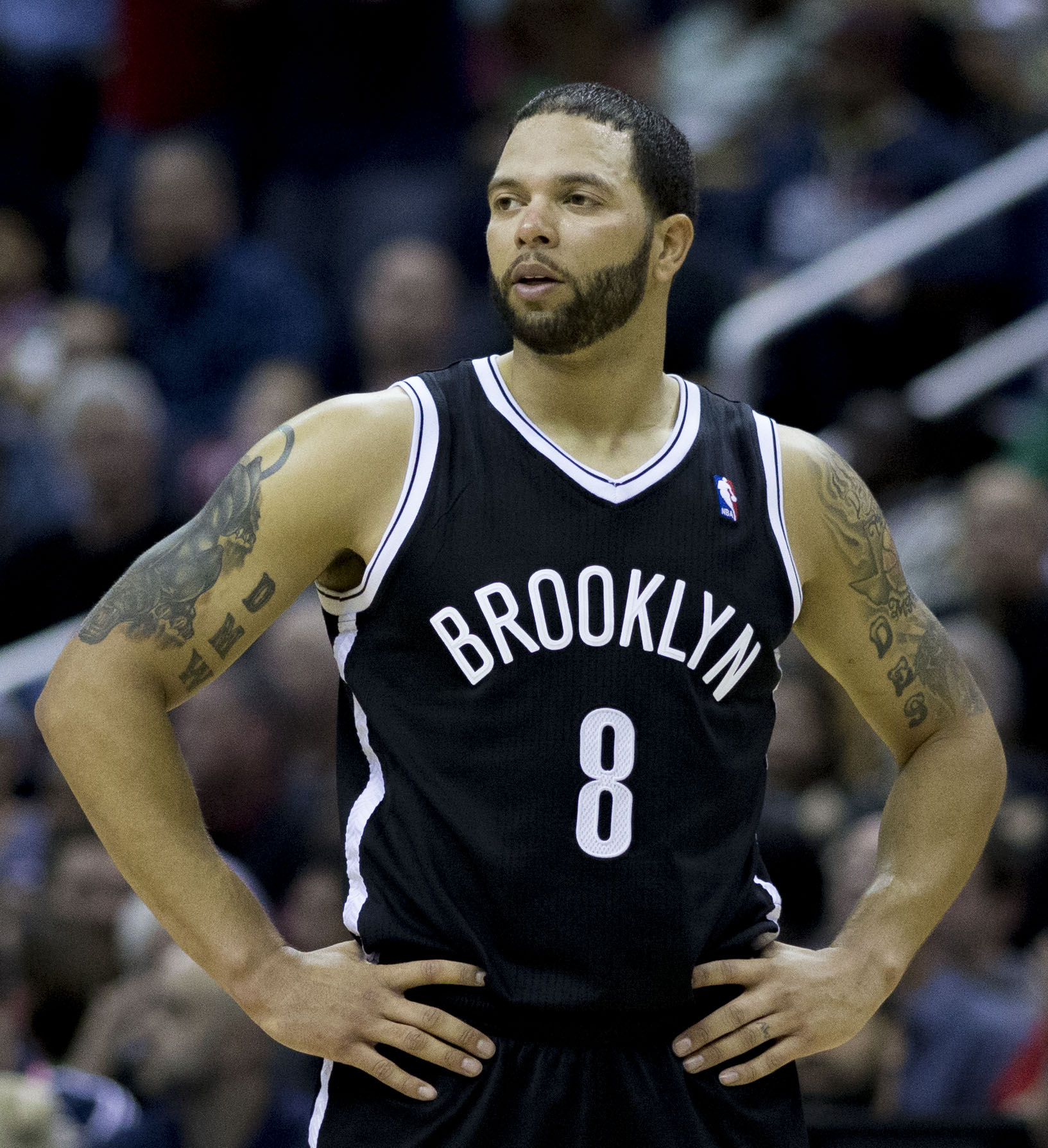
Deron Williams

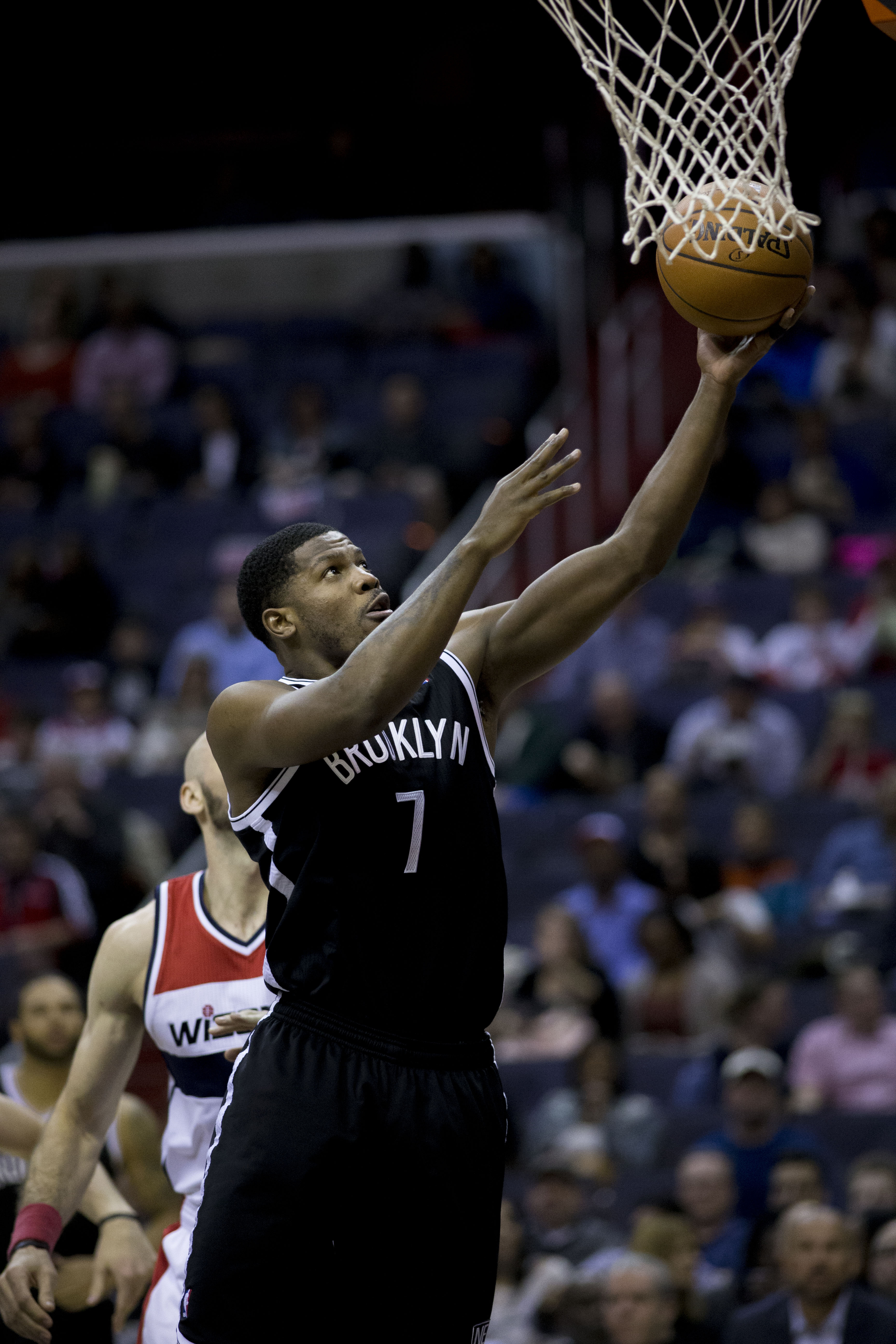
Joe Johnson

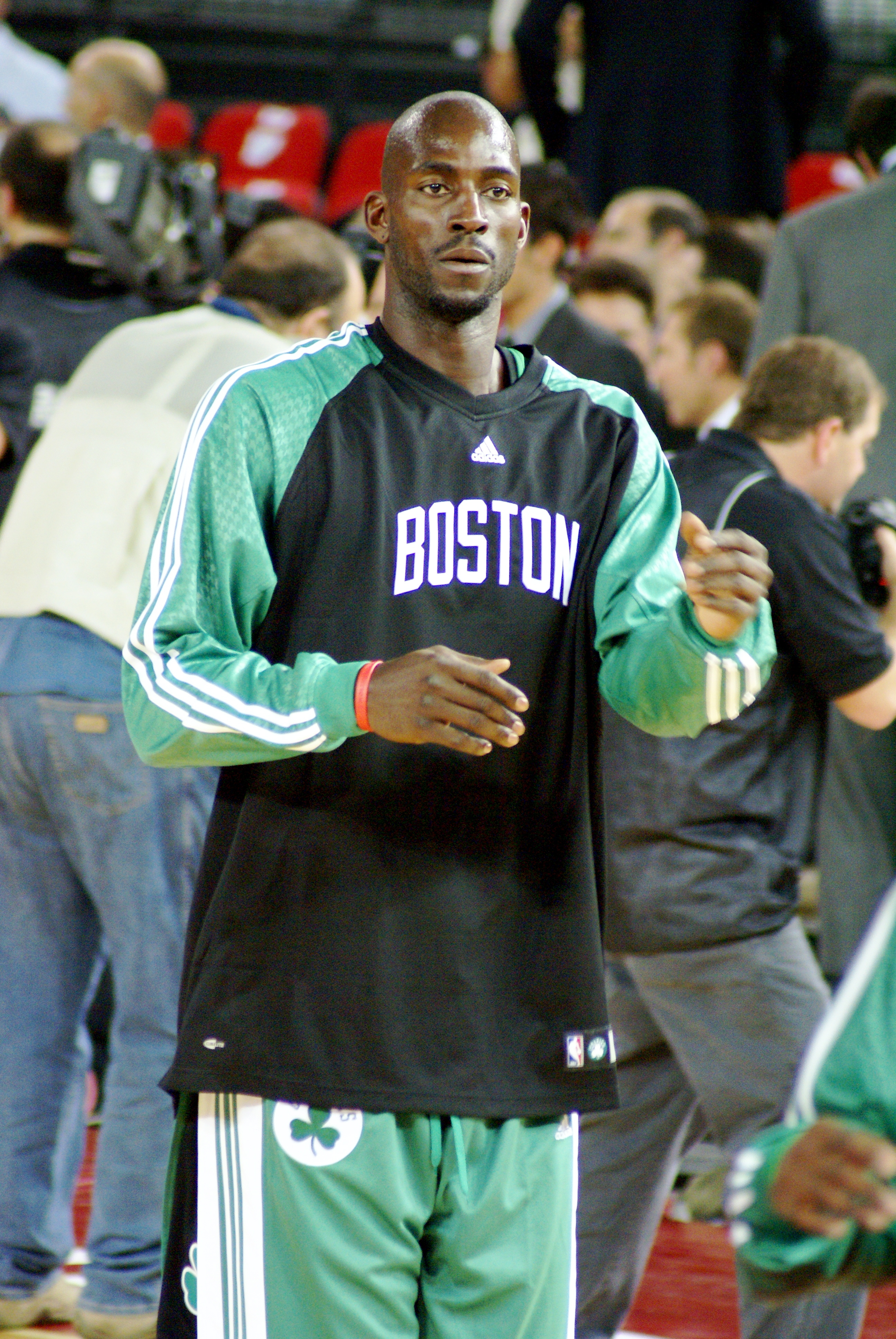
Kevin Garnett

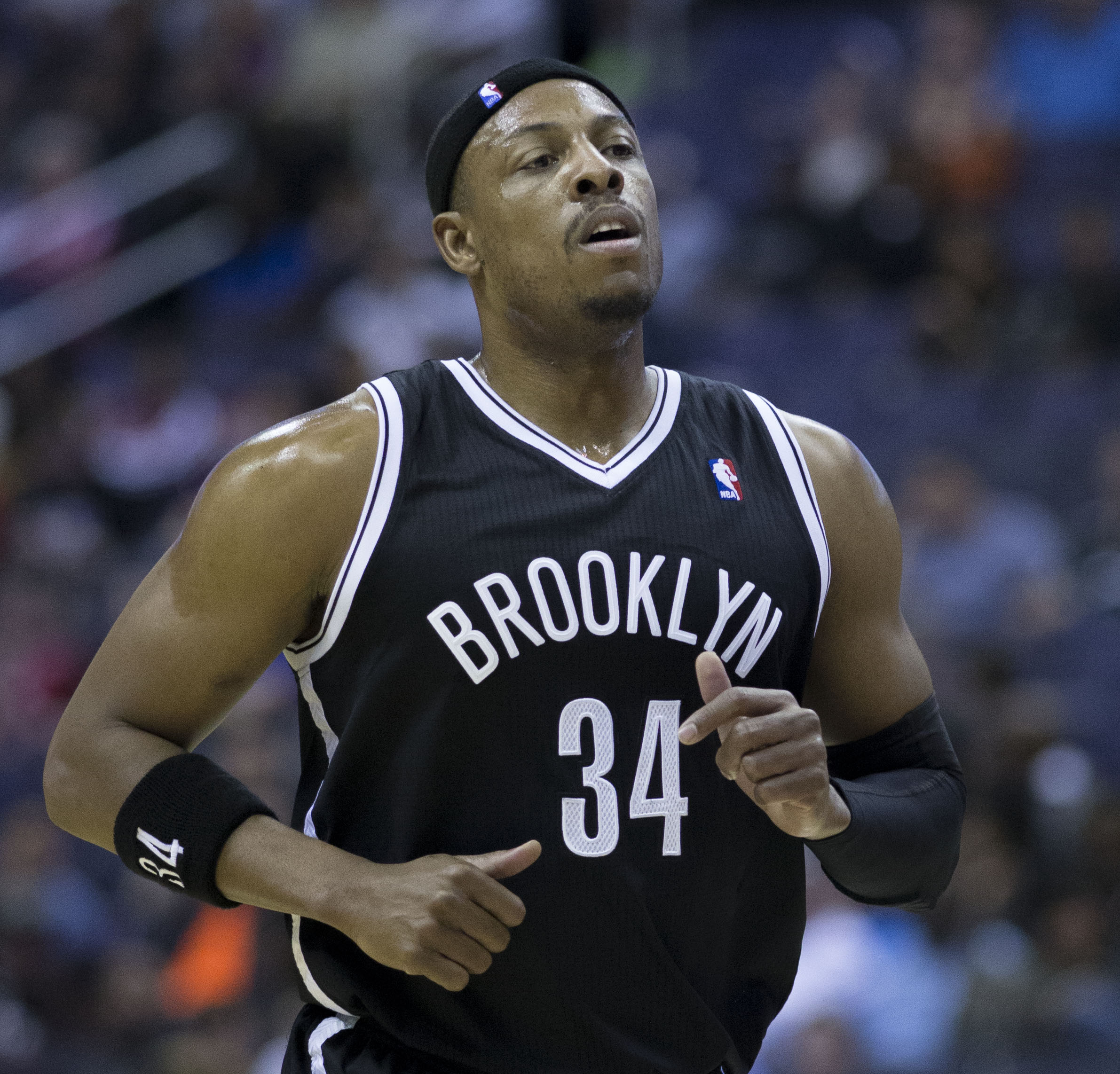
Paul Pierce

On July 12, 2013, the Brooklyn Nets acquired Kevin Garnett and Paul Pierce from the Celtics, pairing them with Deron Williams and Joe Johnson. The Nets looked poised to contend ahead of the 2013–14 season, but both Garnett and Pierce were in their late 30s and Williams' production declined due to injuries. The Nets ultimately won 44 games and were eliminated by the Heat in the second round. The following season, Pierce joined the Washington Wizards, and Garnett was traded midseason back to the Minnesota Timberwolves. After losing in the first round to the Atlanta Hawks in 2015, the Nets did not re-sign Williams who later joined the Dallas Mavericks. Then midway through the 2015–16 season, the Nets waived Johnson who ultimately joined the Heat. The trade for Pierce and Garnett for future 1st round picks resulted for the Celtics drafting Jayson Tatum and Jaylen Brown using Brooklyn's draft picks which ultimately won the Celtics a title in 2024.

=== 2017–2018: Oklahoma City Thunder ===
Oklahoma City Thunder superteam

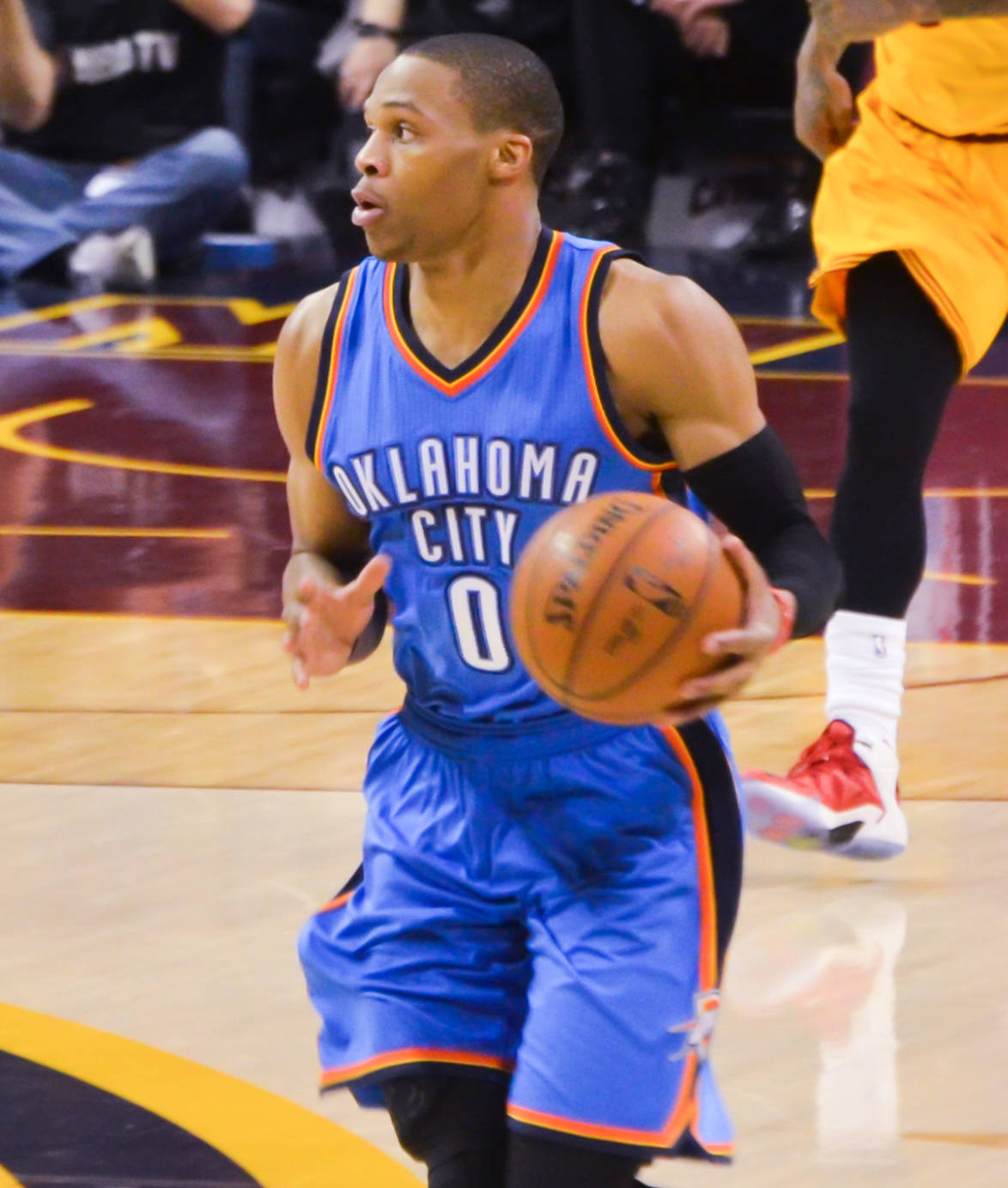
Russell Westbrook

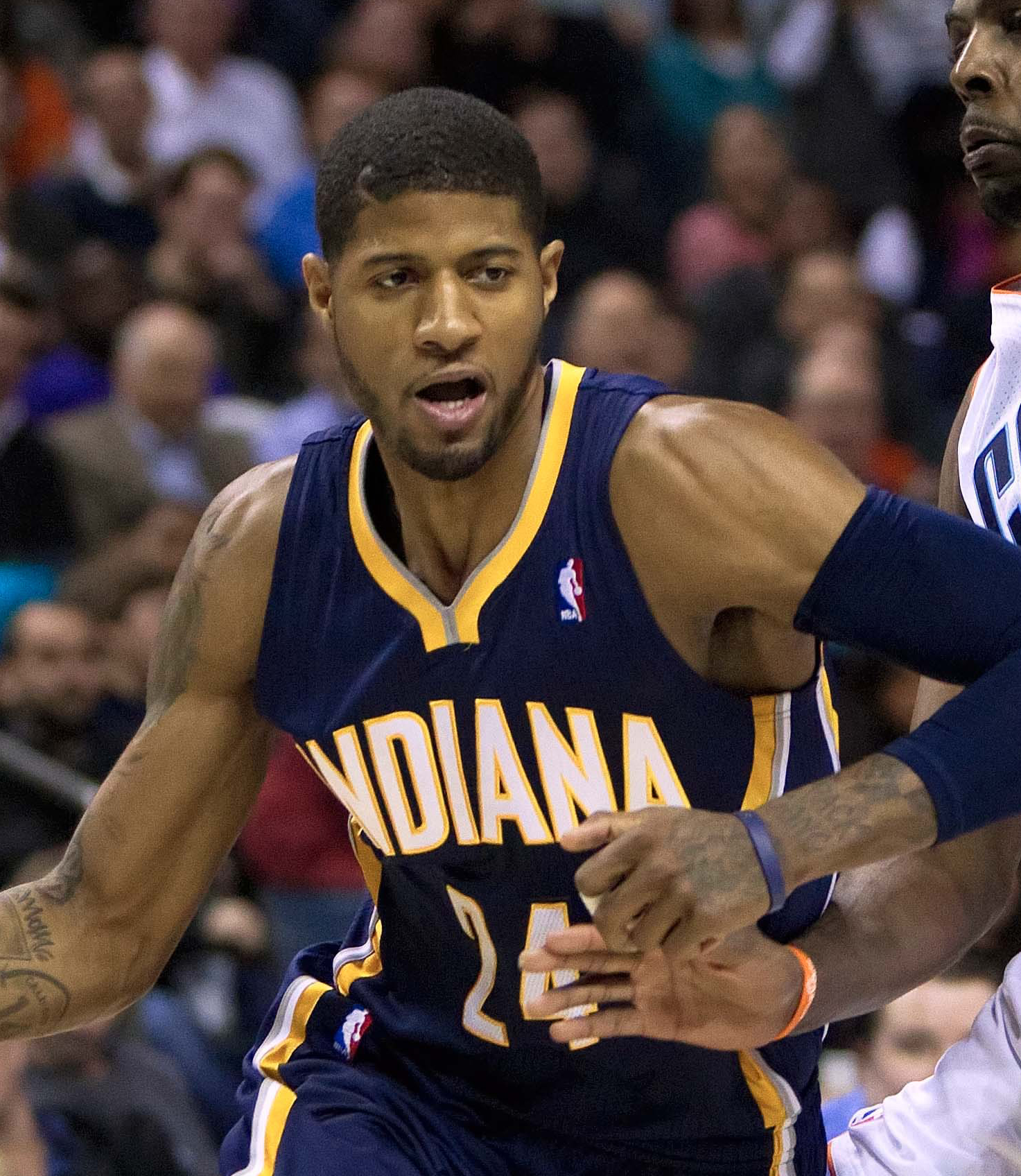
Paul George

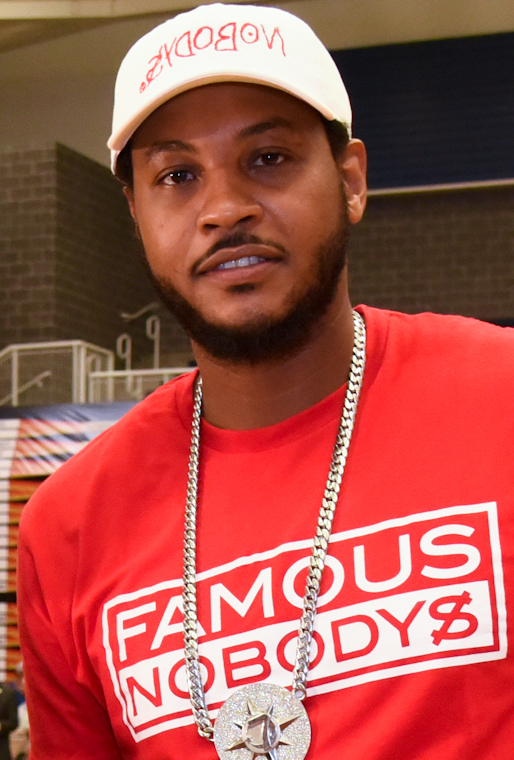
Carmelo Anthony

The Thunder had finished 47–35 in their 2016–17 season, during which Russell Westbrook joined Oscar Robertson as the only players to average a triple-double for an entire season. But after losing in the first round to the Houston Rockets, the Thunder made a pair of superstar trades in order to give Westbrook support, trading for Paul George from the Indiana Pacers on July 6, and Carmelo Anthony from the New York Knicks on September 25. The trio of Westbrook, George and Anthony were nicknamed the "OK3". But the Thunder only managed a one-game improvement from the previous season before they were eliminated in the first round by the Utah Jazz. Westbrook again averaged a triple-double for the season, and George put up 21 ppg. However, Anthony had his worst statistical season to that point, mustering only 16 ppg while also playing a reduced role offensively. After the season, the Thunder traded Anthony to the Atlanta Hawks for Dennis Schröder before getting waived. In the 2018–19 season, the Westbrook-George tandem carried the Thunder to a 49-win season but fell in the first round again, this time to the Portland Trail Blazers. After that season the Thunder traded Westbrook to the Houston Rockets for Chris Paul. George then was traded to the Los Angeles Clippers who wanted George to pair with Kawhi Leonard, in the trade they got future MVP Shai Gilgeous-Alexander and Danilo Gallinari.

=== 2021–2022: Brooklyn Nets ===
Brooklyn Nets superteam

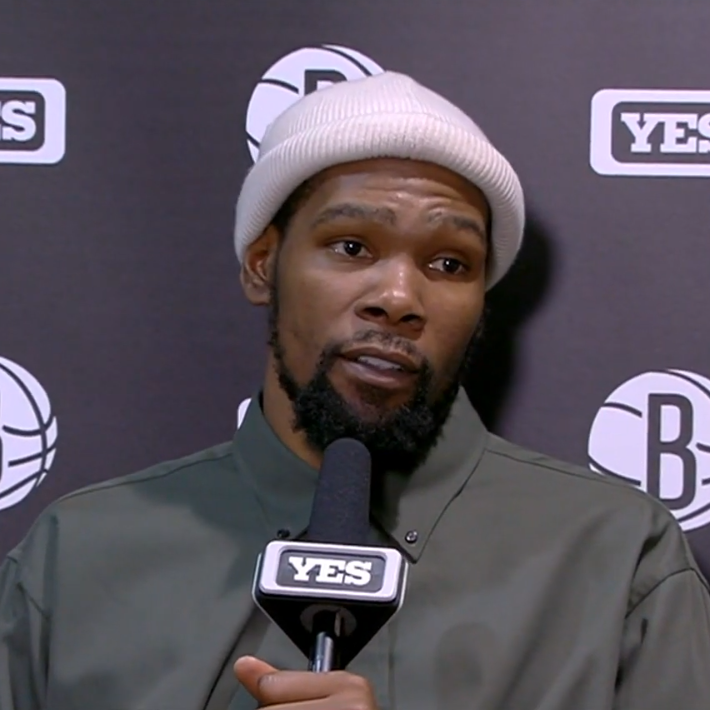
Kevin Durant

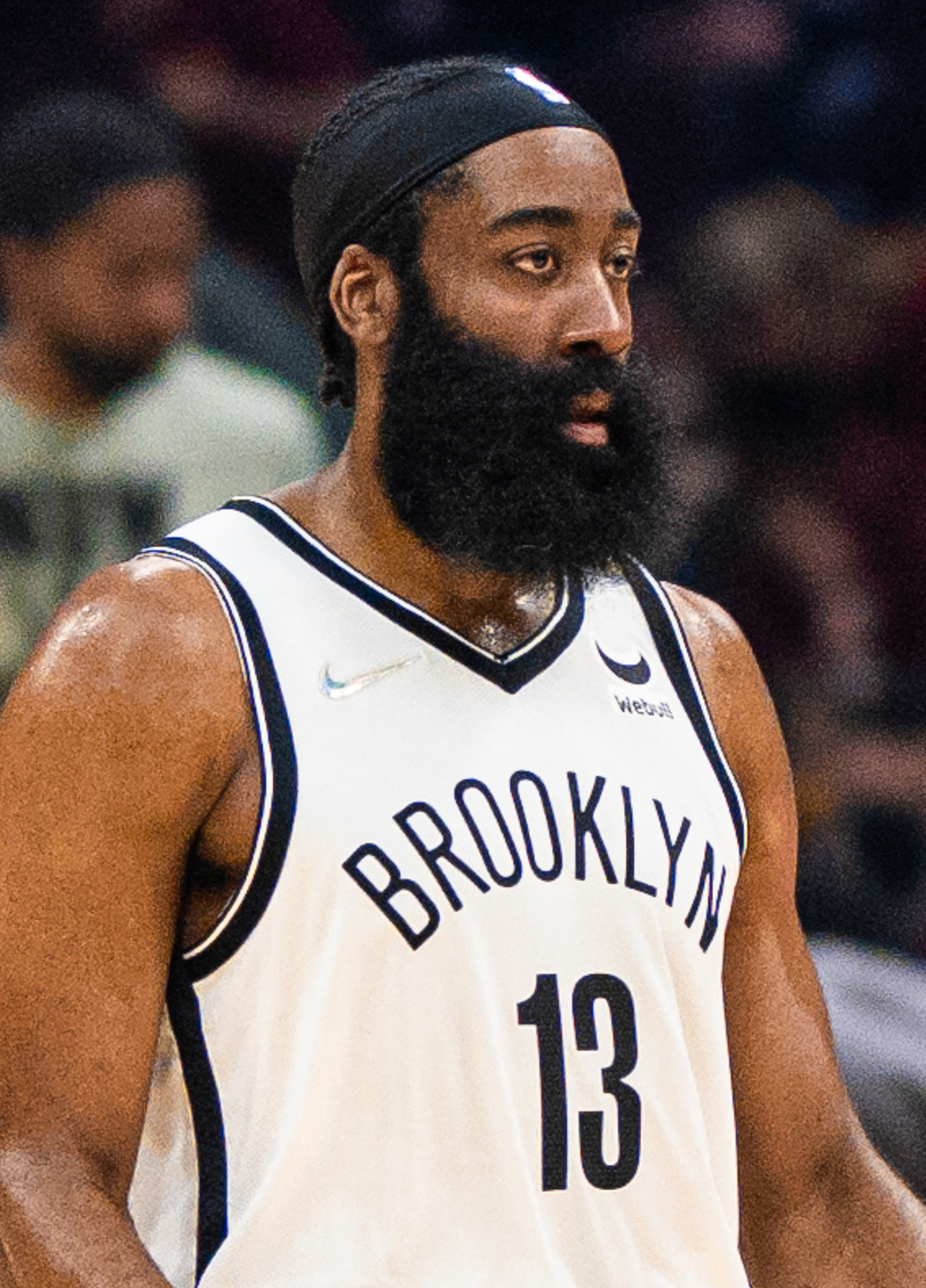
James Harden

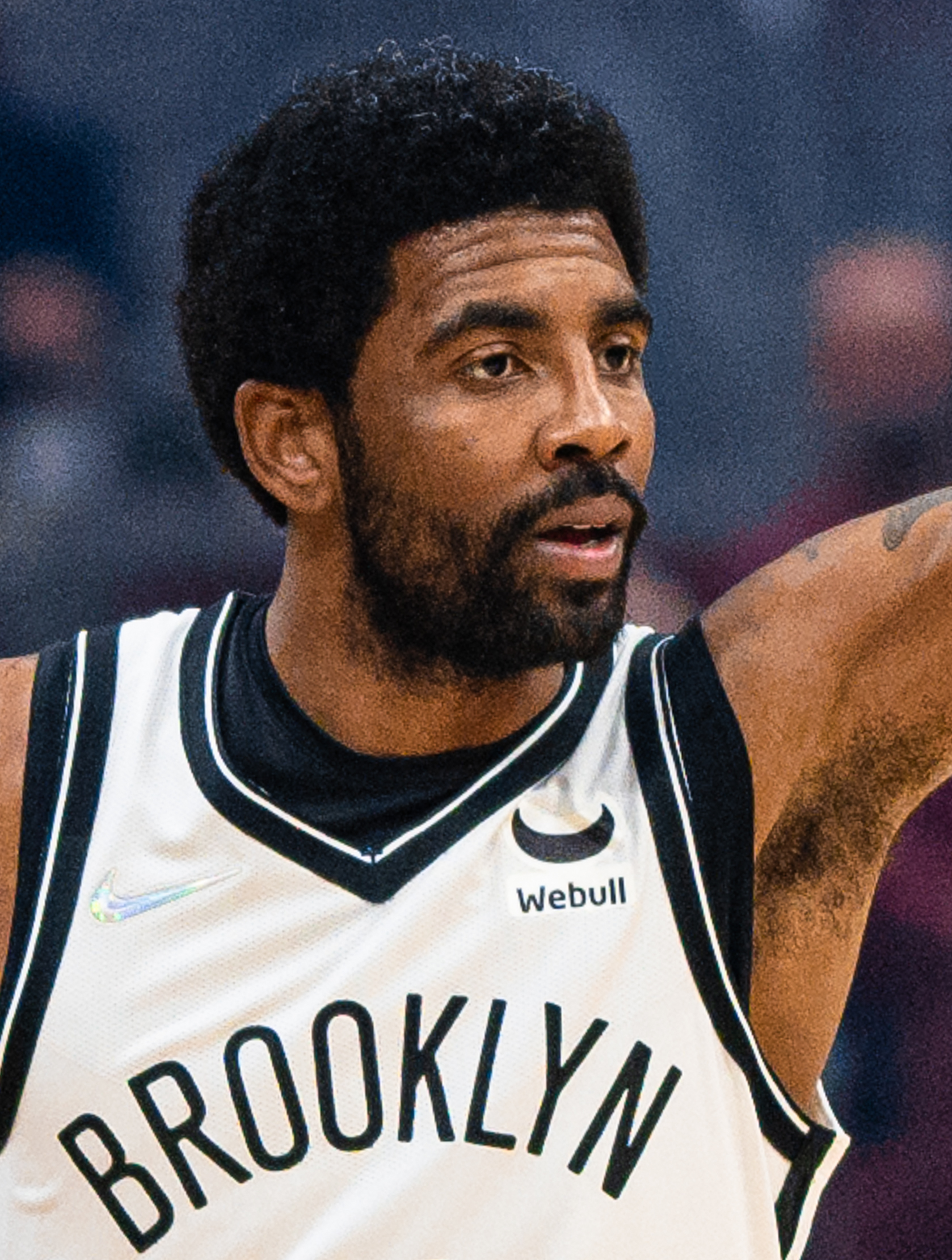
Kyrie Irving

In the summer of 2019, the Brooklyn Nets signed Kyrie Irving and Kevin Durant, who was coming off a torn achilles suffered in Game 5 of the 2019 NBA Finals. The Nets also hired Steve Nash as head coach. On January 13, 2021, the Nets traded for James Harden in a four-team trade, which reunited Harden with his former Oklahoma City Thunder teammate Durant. The team struggled through various injuries during the 2020–21 season along with Kyrie Irving's stance on the vaccine by not following the vaccination mandate of COVID-19 in New York which limited him to road games (besides the Knicks) and were eliminated by the eventual champion Milwaukee Bucks in overtime of Game 7 in the second round. The following season, Harden requested and was given a trade after only 12 months with the team, going to the 76ers in exchange for a package headlined by All-Star Ben Simmons. Simmons sat out the remainder of the season, and the team finished 7th in the conference, surviving the play-in tournament against the Cleveland Cavaliers before being swept by the eventual Conference champion Celtics in the first round. In February 2023, Irving also requested a trade and was sent to the Dallas Mavericks. Following Irving's trade, Durant was subsequently traded to the Phoenix Suns.

=== 2021–2023: Los Angeles Lakers ===
Los Angeles Lakers superteam

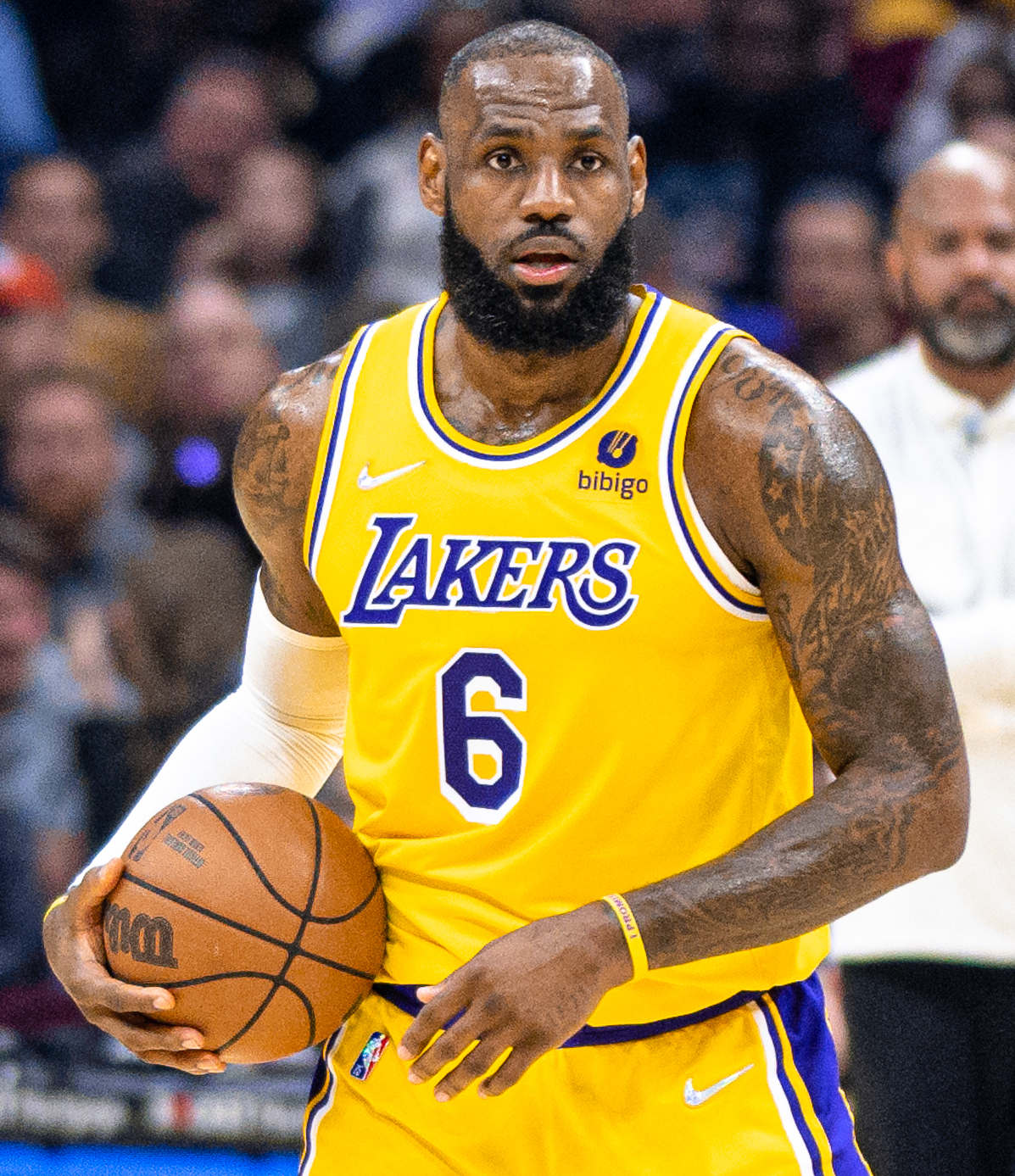
LeBron James

Anthony Davis

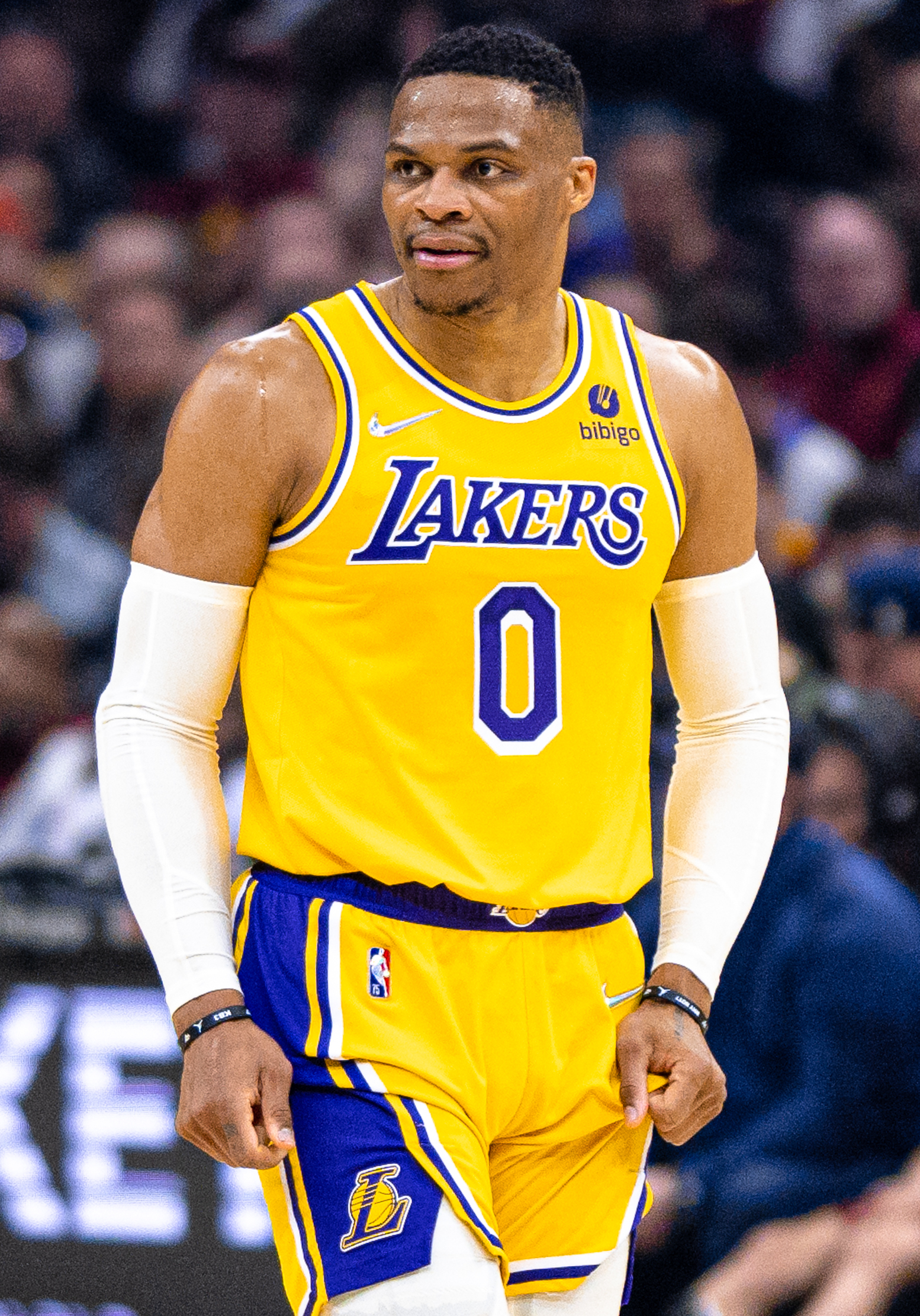
Russell Westbrook

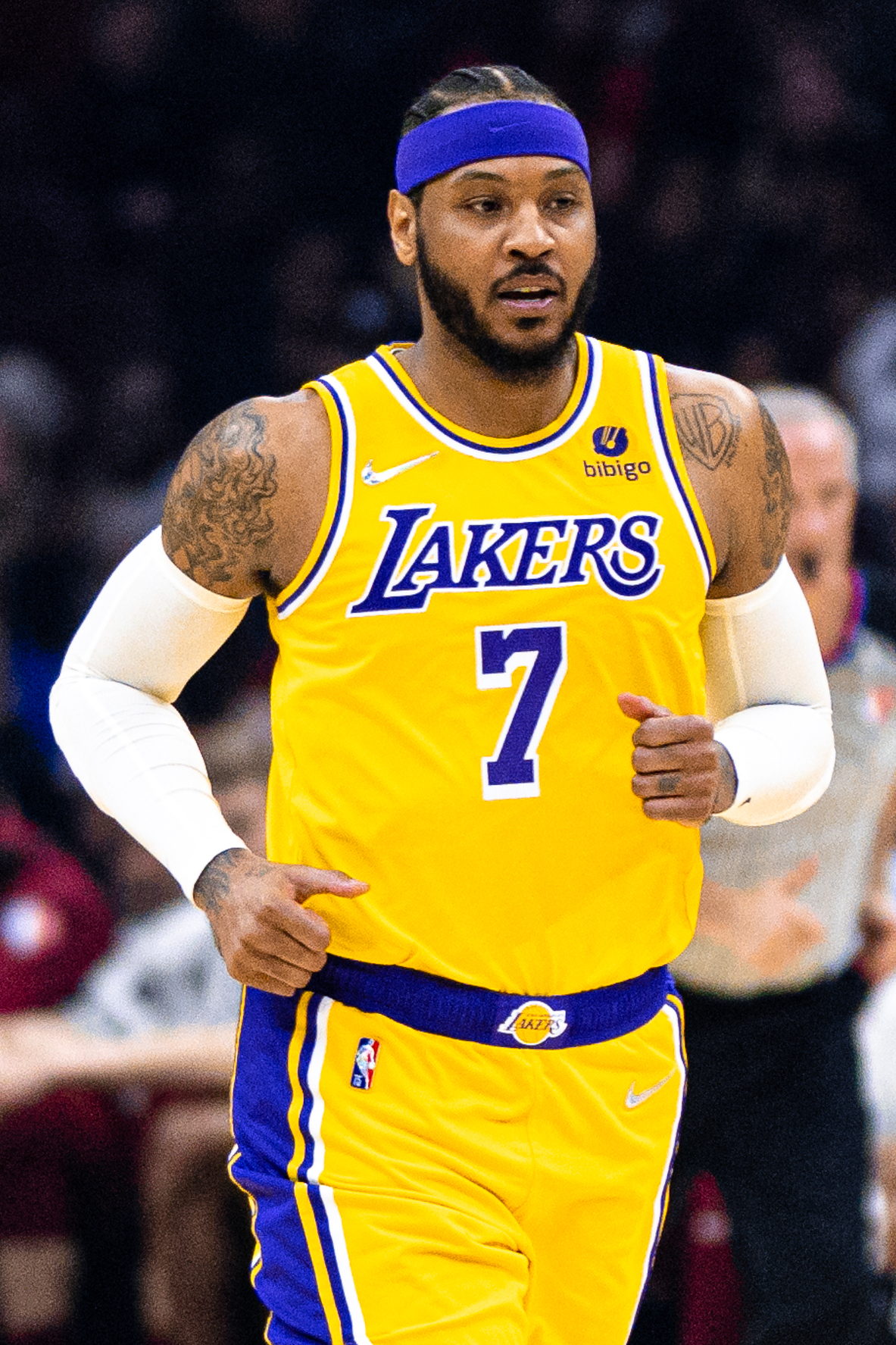
Carmelo Anthony

After sustaining the longest playoff drought in franchise history, even after acquiring LeBron James in free agency from the Cleveland Cavaliers, the Lakers traded for All-NBA player Anthony Davis of the New Orleans Pelicans. Despite an interruption caused by the COVID-19 pandemic, the Lakers ended their drought and won the 2020 NBA Finals at the 2020 NBA Bubble. In the next season, the team ended the regular season as the 7th seed and participated in the first iteration of the NBA play-in tournament before ultimately losing 4-2 in their first round series against the Phoenix Suns.

During the 2021 free agency period, the Lakers acquired Russell Westbrook in a five-team trade, and signed Carmelo Anthony, Dwight Howard, Rajon Rondo, DeAndre Jordan, Trevor Ariza, Avery Bradley, as well as Malik Monk. Along with the contemporary Brooklyn Nets superteam, the Lakers were expected to be clear championship contenders, and both teams were considered heavy favorites to meet in the 2022 NBA Finals. In contrast to these high expectations, the 2021–22 Lakers finished with a 33–49 record and missed the playoffs entirely, a result that multiple outlets termed the "most disappointing team in NBA history". As a result, the team fired head coach Frank Vogel after the end of their season, and hired Darvin Ham as his replacement. Further struggles throughout the following season forced the team to make changes to the roster, causing them to trade Westbrook to the Utah Jazz.

=== 2023–2024: Los Angeles Clippers ===
Los Angeles Clippers superteam

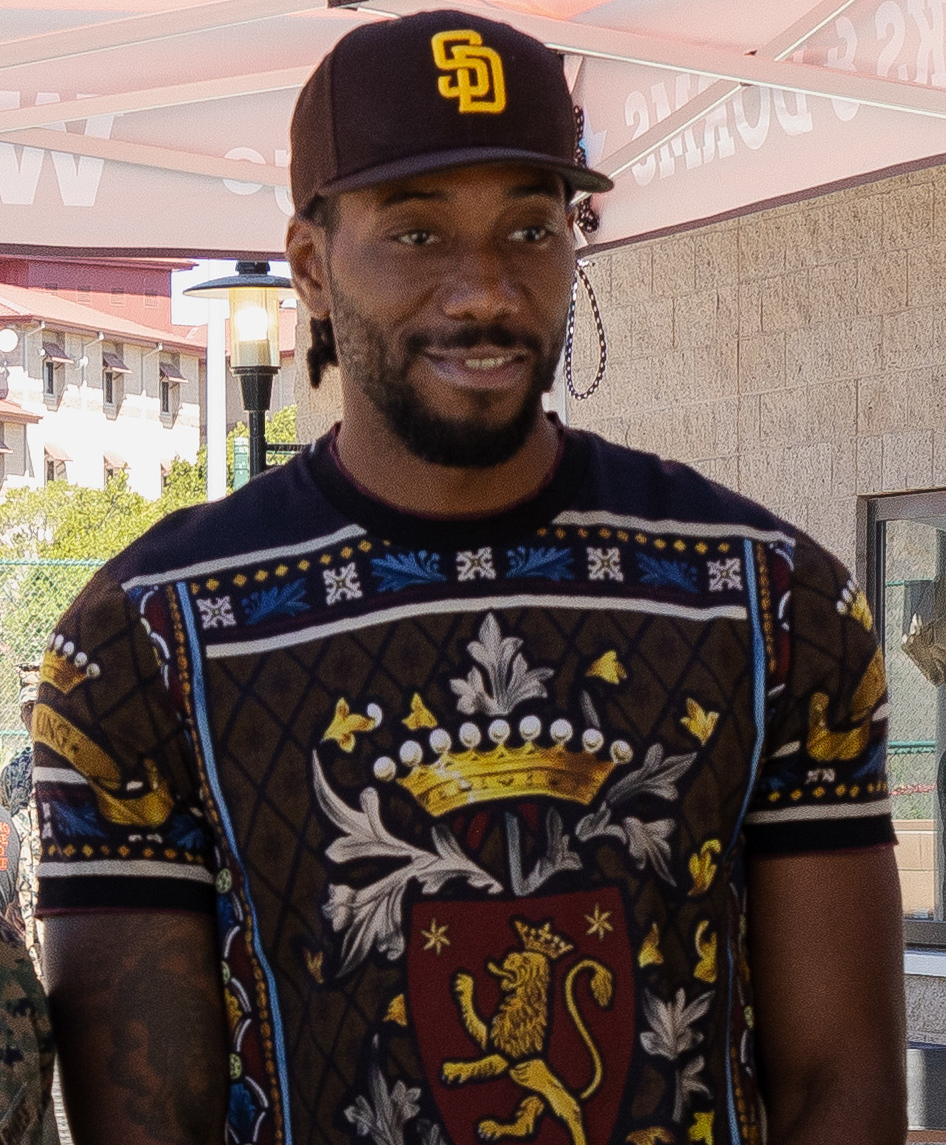
Kawhi Leonard

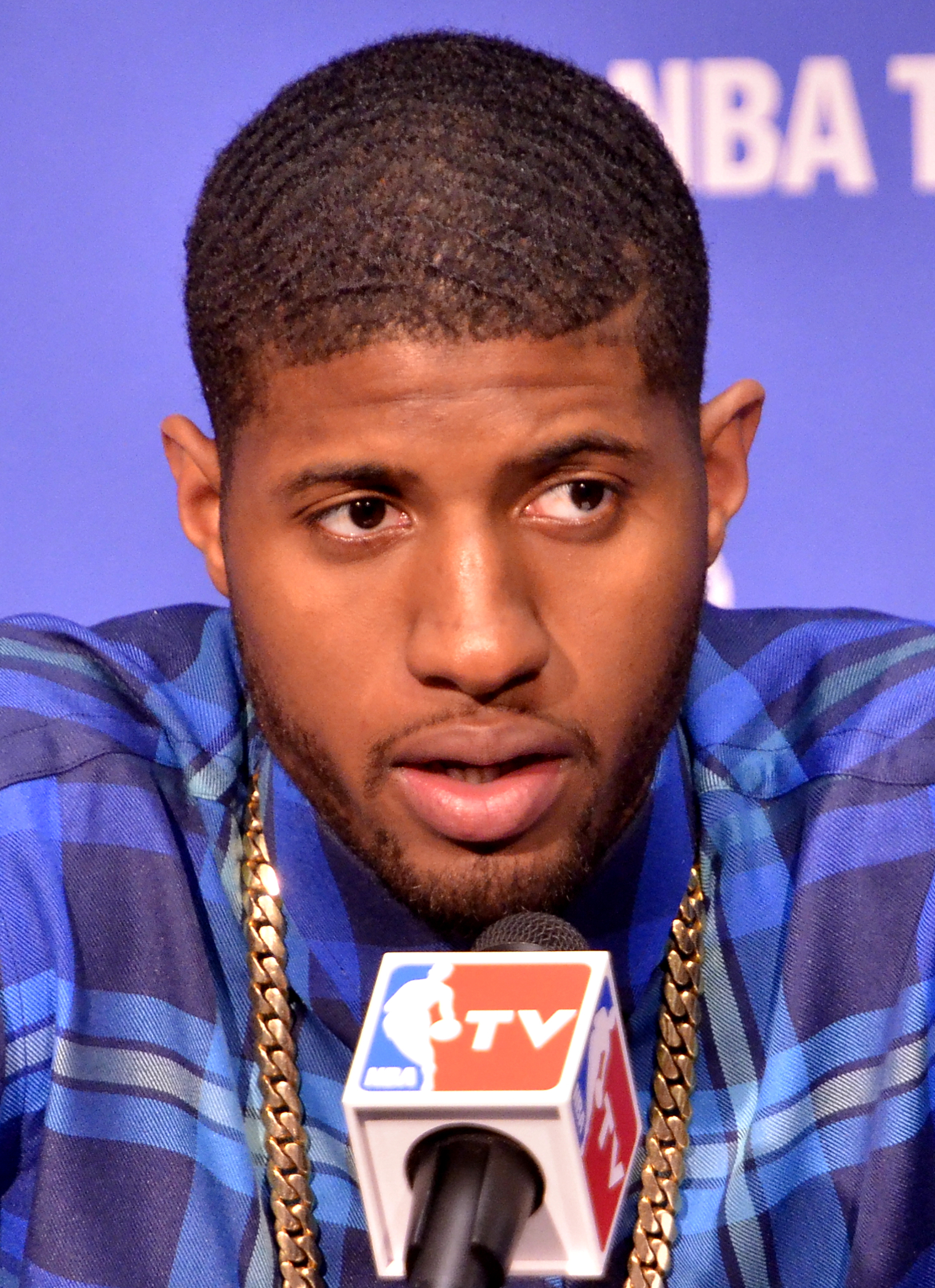
Paul George

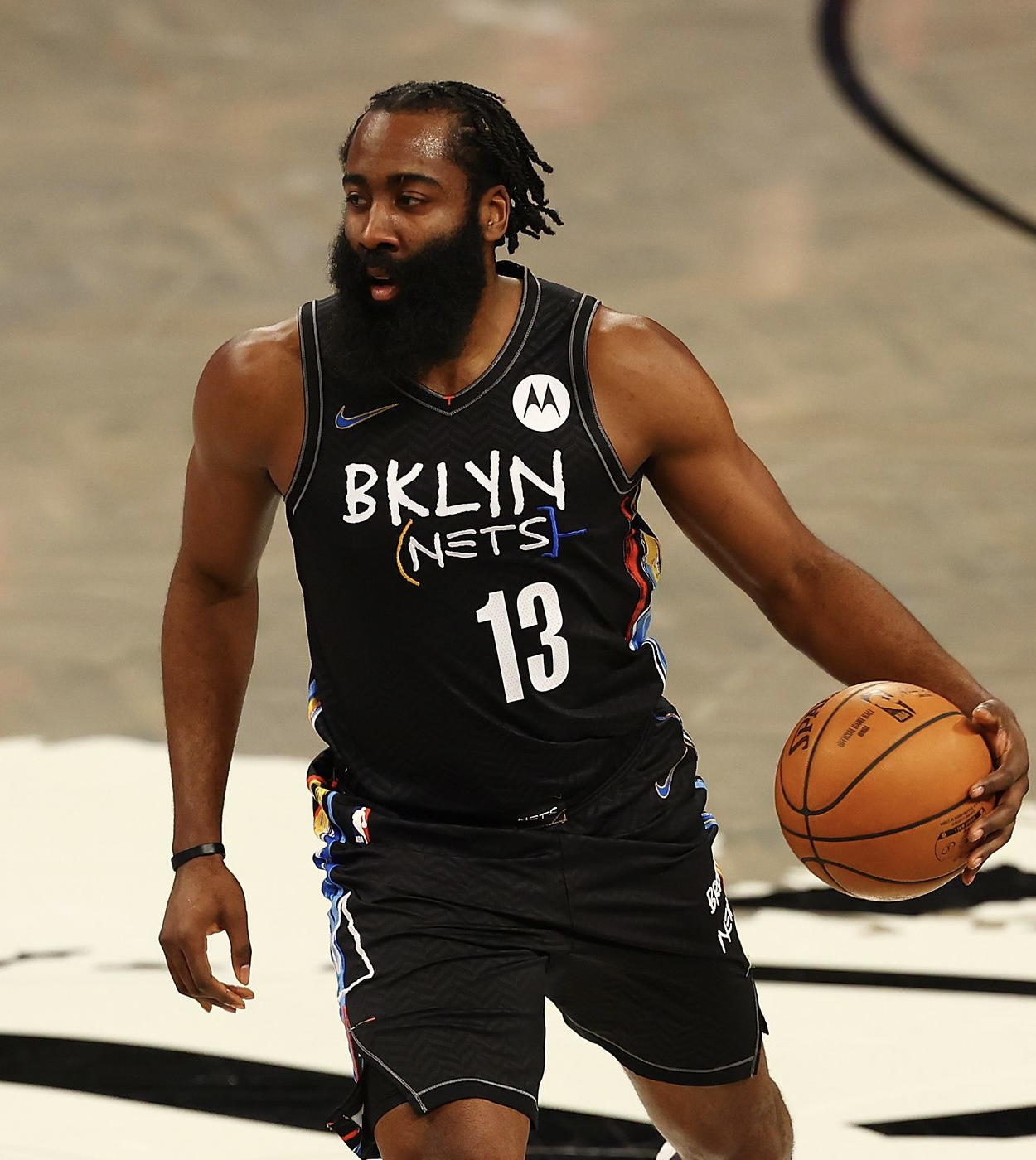
James Harden

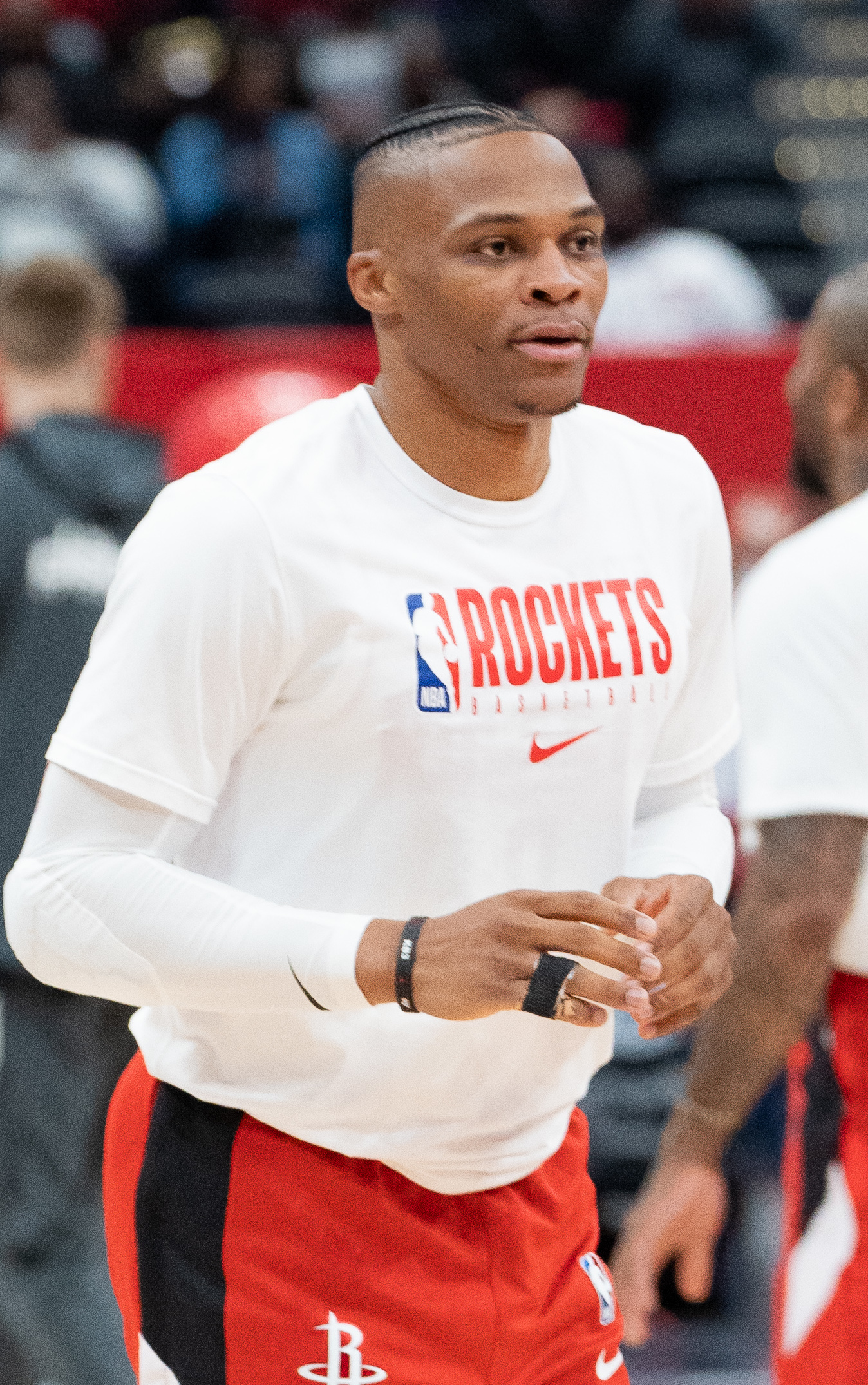
Russell Westbrook

After winning the 2019 NBA Finals in his sole season with the Toronto Raptors over the superteam Golden State Warriors, Kawhi Leonard signed as a free agent with his hometown Los Angeles Clippers. At the same time, the Clippers traded with the Oklahoma City Thunder for star forward Paul George for Shai Gilgeous-Alexander to the Thunder who whined up helping the Thunder for championship success as a franchise player. The pair's first two seasons together resulted in a 4-3 series loss to the Denver Nuggets in the second round of the 2020 NBA playoffs in the NBA Bubble and then a 4–2 loss in the first franchise's first ever Western Conference Finals appearance to the Phoenix Suns featuring former Clippers guard Chris Paul. With Leonard missing the entire 2021–22 NBA season, the team posted a 42–40 record and failed to qualify for the 2022 Playoffs after losing two games in the play-in tournament. The Clippers later signed former MVP point guard Russell Westbrook off waivers in 2023, which aided their return to the playoffs, but lost 4–1 to the Phoenix Suns superteam, with Leonard missing most of the series. On November 1, 2023, the Clippers acquired James Harden from the Philadelphia 76ers. The team finished with a 51–31 record and faced the Dallas Mavericks in the first round of the playoffs for the third time in five years, losing 4–2 with Leonard missing most of the series. That summer, George signed a four-year deal with the Philadelphia 76ers and Westbrook was traded to the Utah Jazz for a Kris Dunn sign-and-trade, officially ending not just George and Leonard's dynamic duo period, but also their brief superteam run as well. While in 2026, James Harden was traded to the Cavaliers. Leonard would eventually be traded to the Toronto Raptors during the 2026 offseason.

=== 2023–2025: Phoenix Suns ===
Phoenix Suns superteam

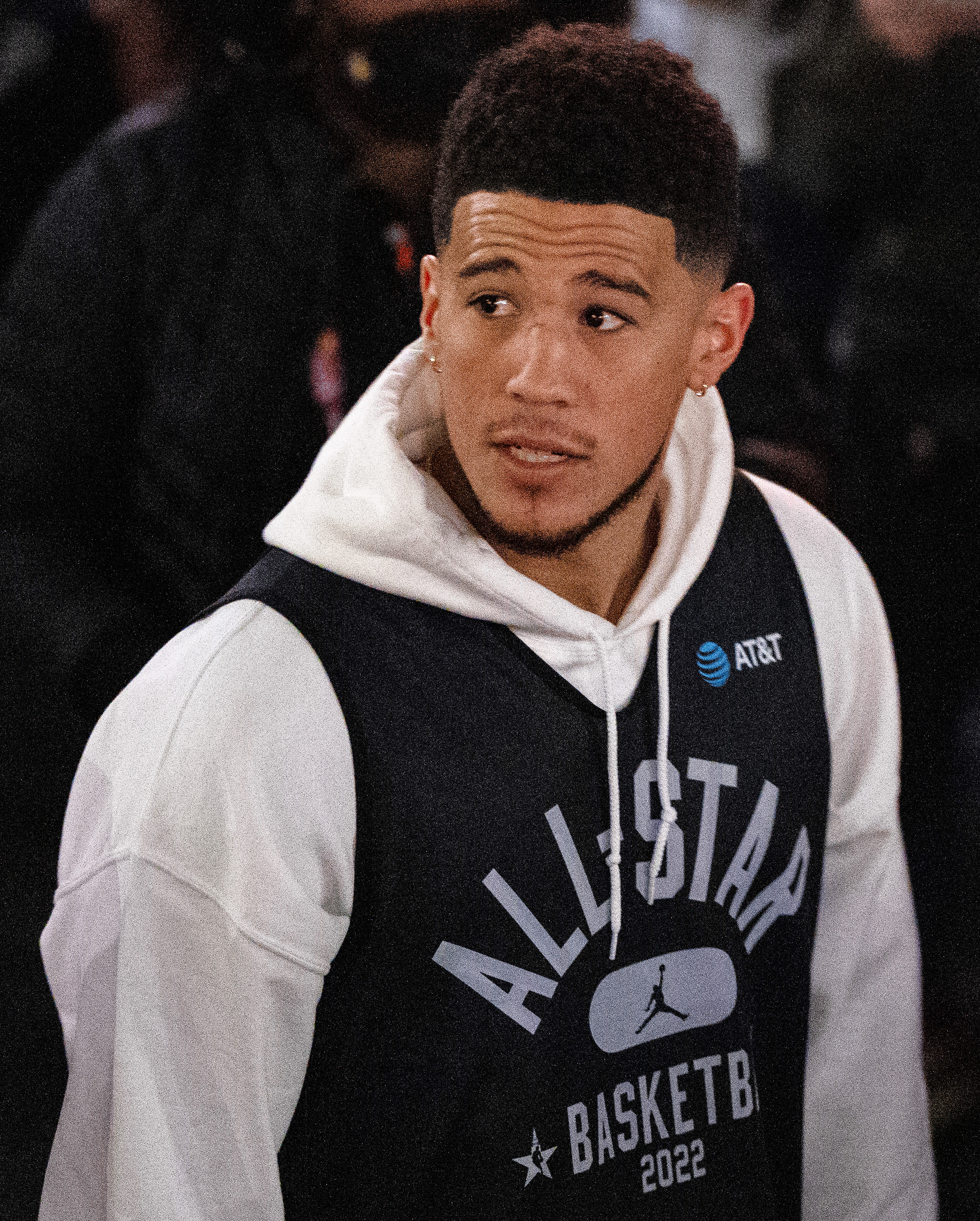
Devin Booker

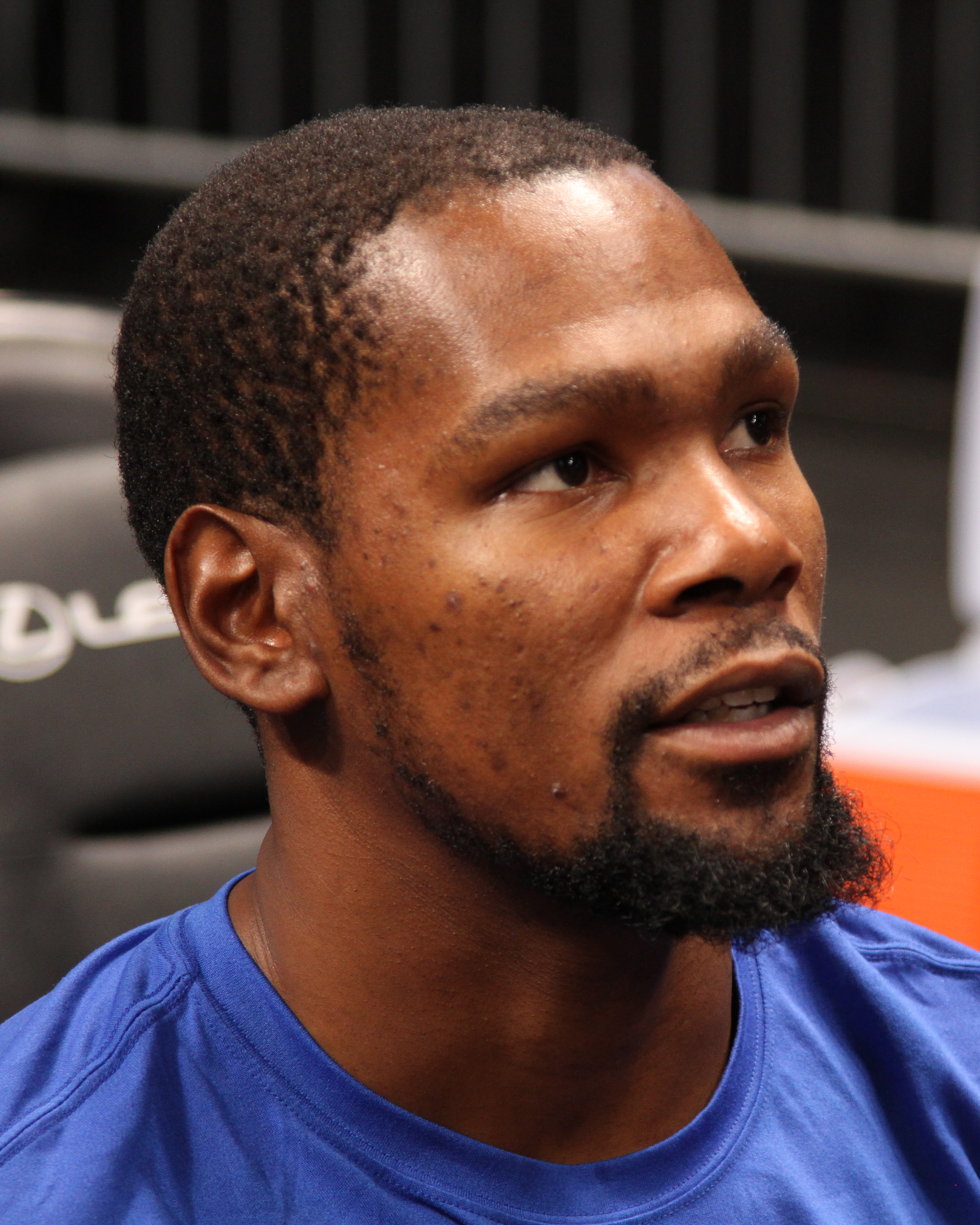
Kevin Durant

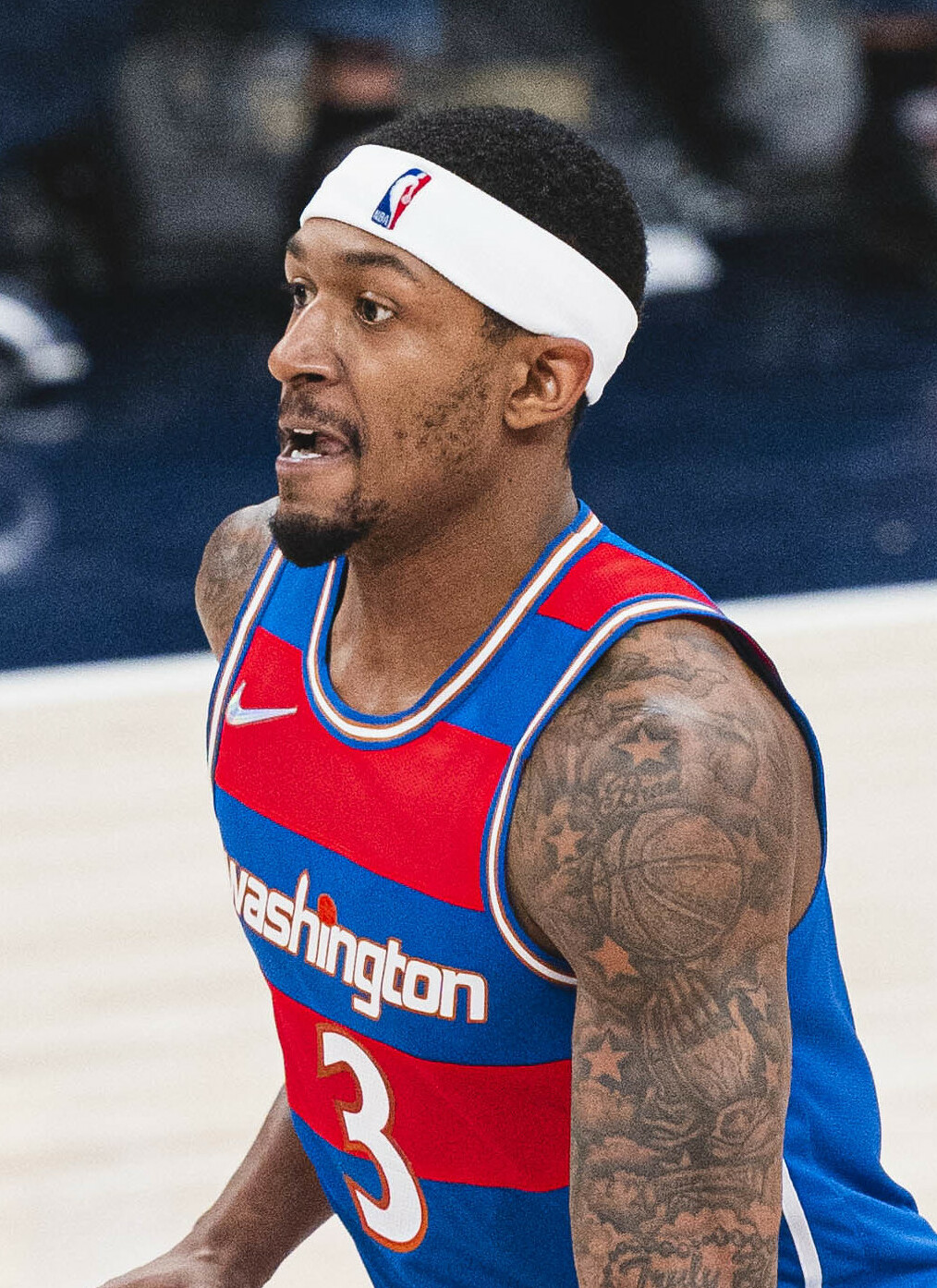
Bradley Beal

The Phoenix Suns drafted Devin Booker as the 13th pick in the 2015 NBA draft. Before the 2020–21 NBA season, Phoenix acquired star point guard Chris Paul in a trade with the Oklahoma City Thunder. The addition of Paul not only ended their decade-long playoff drought, but also helped the team reach the NBA Finals for the first time since 1993, ultimately losing 4-2 to Giannis Antetokounmpo and the Milwaukee Bucks. The next year, the Suns achieved the best regular season record in franchise history at 64–18, but were unable to duplicate the prior year's playoff success, losing a 4-3 series against Luka Dončić and the Dallas Mavericks. In the following season, during which an ownership controversy forced former owner Robert Sarver to sell the team, the team acquired Kevin Durant in a trade at the 2023 trade deadline with the Brooklyn Nets, effectively creating a superteam. Injuries limited Durant during the regular season and Paul during the postseason leading to the Suns finishing the season with a 4-2 series loss to the eventual champion Denver Nuggets in the second round. As a result, the Suns fired head coach Monty Williams and replaced him with Frank Vogel. In the aftermath of their first year as a superteam, the Suns traded Paul to the Washington Wizards on June 24, 2023 in order to acquire Bradley Beal. In a rocky first season with Beal, the Suns earned the #6 seed in the Western Conference at 49–33 before losing in the first round to the Minnesota Timberwolves in a four game sweep. This led to the Suns firing Vogel after only one season with the team and hiring the head coach that had originally beaten them in the 2021 Finals, Mike Budenholzer. The Suns finished the next season 36-46 and 11th in the Western Conference, missing the playoffs entirely. Mike Budenholzer was fired on April 14th, marking back-to-back seasons when their head coach lasted one year (and the fourth time in the last seven seasons). Kevin Durant was officially traded to the Houston Rockets on July 6th and Bradley Beal agreed on a contract buyout with the Suns on July 16th, ending the 'Big 3' era in Phoenix.

=== 2026–present: Philadelphia 76ers ===
Philadelphia 76ers superteam

Joel Embiid

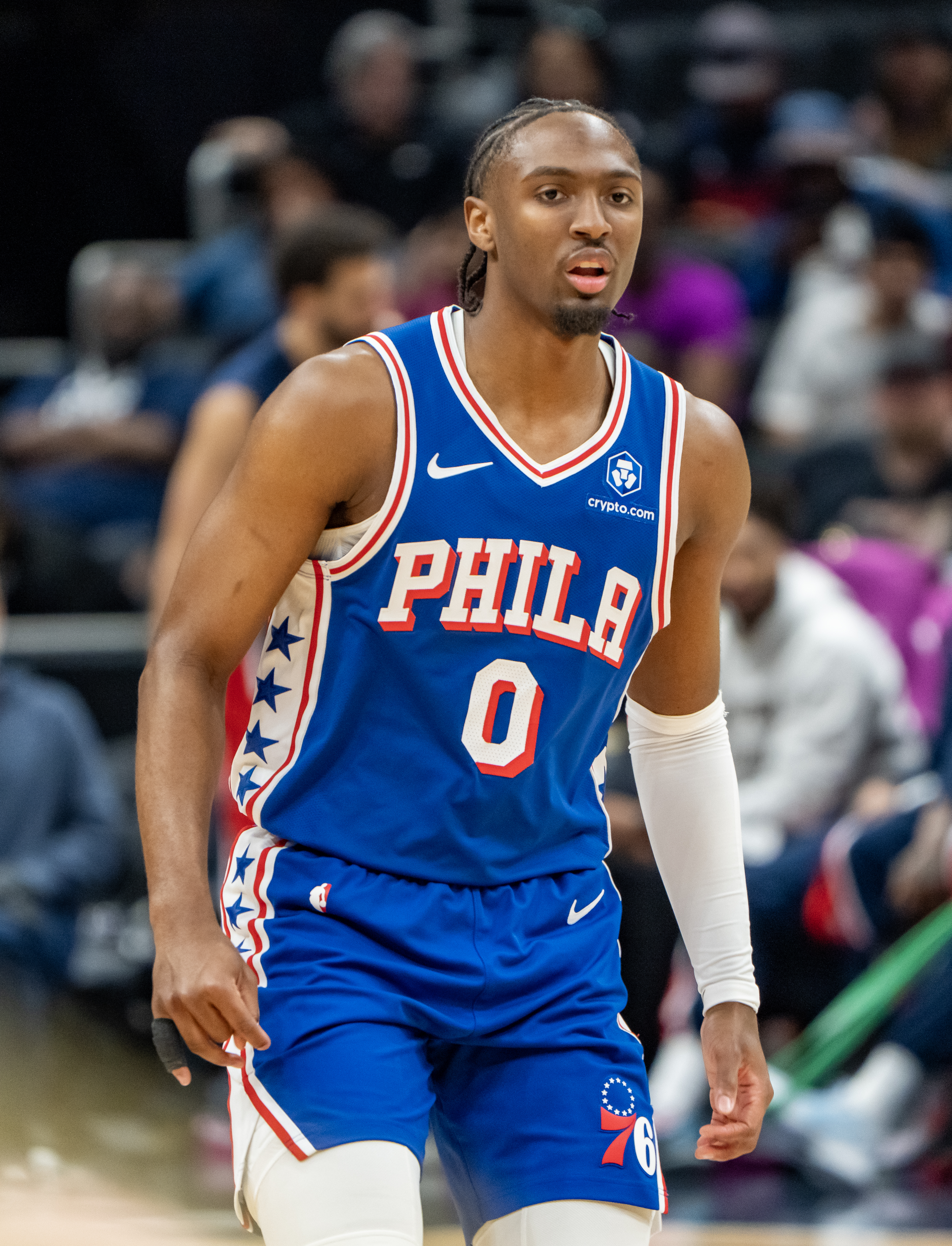
Tyrese Maxey

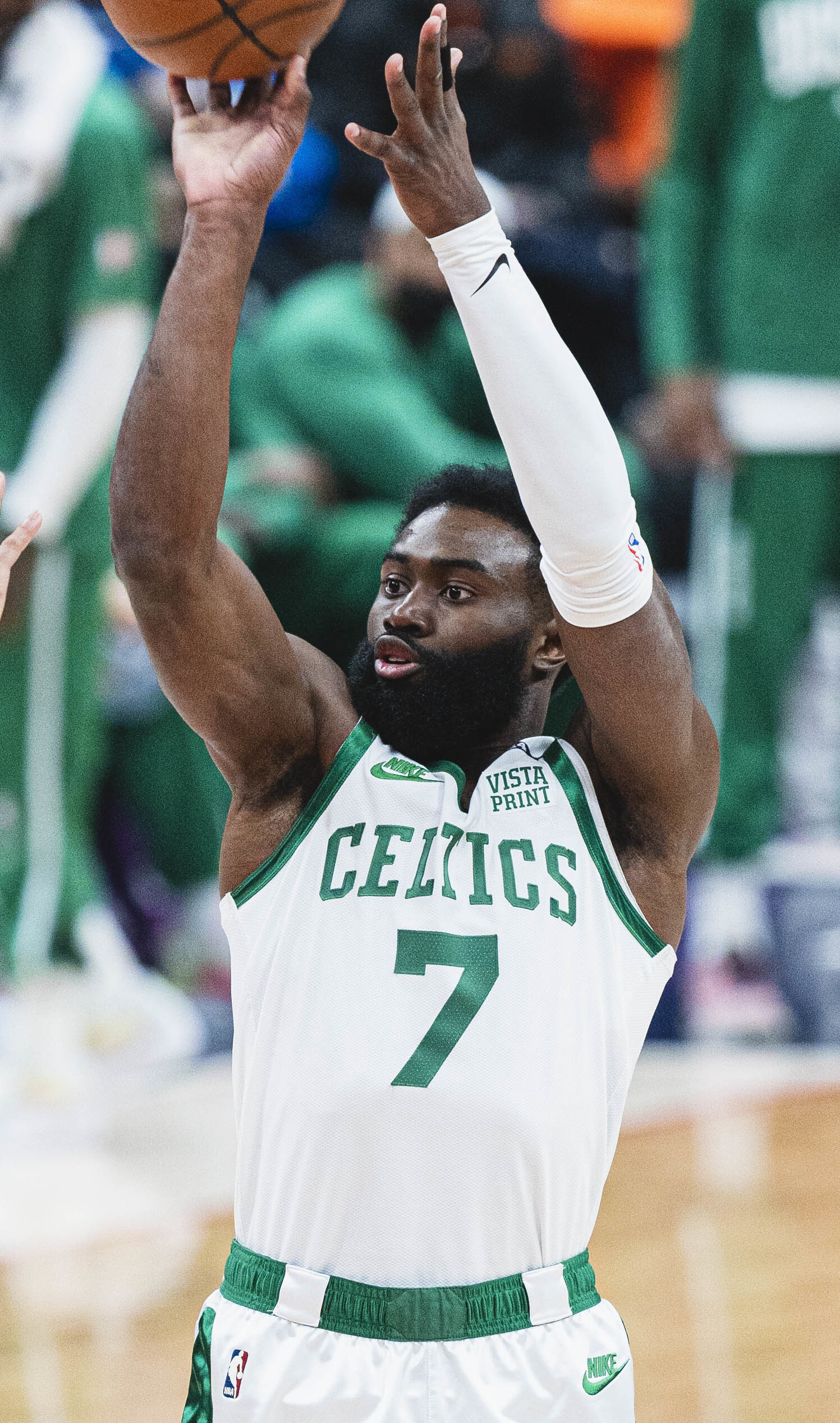
Jaylen Brown

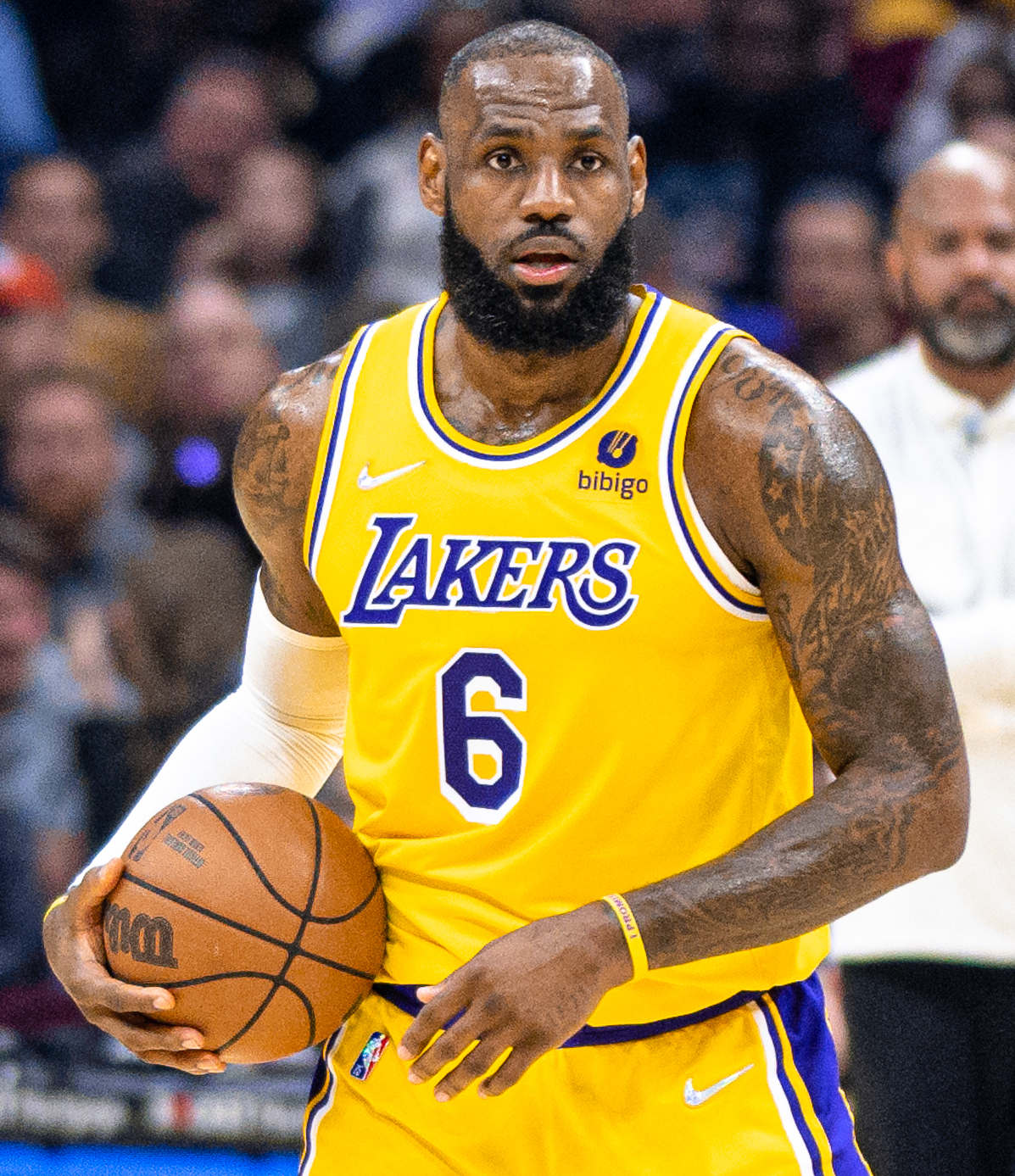
LeBron James

The Philadelphia 76ers drafted Joel Embiid in 2014 during their era of "Trust[ing] the Process" that was first coined by general manager Sam Hinkie for the goal of "tanking" for high draft picks for a higher chance of success, though Embiid wouldn't start for the team until 2016 due to multi-year injury concerns. While the 76ers tried their best to succeed through "The Process" era, the era would ultimately be seen as a dud due to them failing to advance past the Eastern Conference Semifinals throughout that period of time. In 2020, the 76ers would draft Tyrese Maxey with their 21st pick of the draft when it was held in November 2020 due to the COVID-19 pandemic; Maxey would end up being a two-time All-Star in the NBA before the 2026–27 season had begun. During the 2026 offseason period, the 76ers would end up making a surprising trade with the Boston Celtics where Paul George would be traded to Boston for their champion star player Jaylen Brown, who was one half of their recent success alongside Jayson Tatum. Nearly a month after that trade occurred, LeBron James would officially announce that he'd leave the Los Angeles Lakers to sign up with the 76ers on a two-year deal worth $8 million, thus creating the most recent superteam in the NBA.

== Criticism ==
There has been some controversy about superteams in the NBA. Claims persist that superstar players are no longer looking to make the game competitive, but rather finding an easier way to win championships and nullifying smaller contenders by joining other elites. From James joining the Heat to Durant joining the record-breaking 73-win Warriors, there has been derision from the media and fans in their efforts to unbalance the NBA.

Former NBA legends from the 1980s and 90s like Michael Jordan have criticized or questioned the competitiveness of today's superstars. Hall of Fame center Shaquille O'Neal stated that if superteams were accepted back then, he would have joined the 1990s Michael Jordan-led dynasty Bulls or Tim Duncan's Spurs.

However, there have been cases for both sides as others argue that the NBA has achieved its highest-grossing TV revenue, that it was all done under the rules of the salary cap, and that it is enjoyable sports entertainment. Recent efforts made to punish teams that look to assemble long-term superteams, starting in the 2023–24 season, have been implemented under newly established salary cap rules and limitations at hand. One such effort/method made was the creation of the second tax apron, which looks to significantly hamper teams that would look to overspend in order to create their superteams in question.

== See also ==
- Supergroup (music)
