= Trendon Watford =

American basketball player (born 2000)

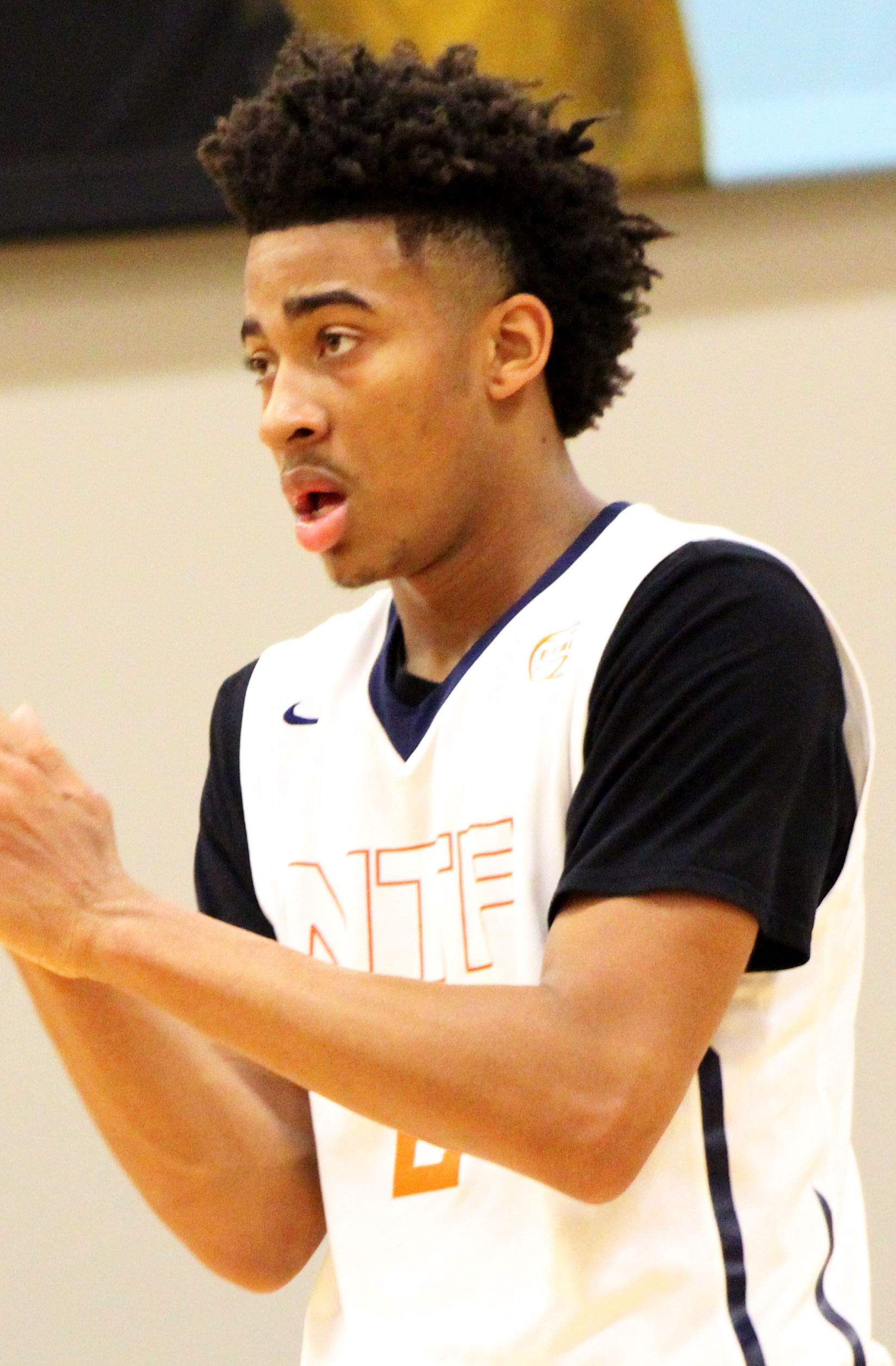
- Watford at the Nike EYBL in April 2017

No. 9 – New Orleans Pelicans
- Position: Small forward / shooting guard
- League: NBA

Personal information
- Born: November 9, 2000 (age 25) Birmingham, Alabama, U.S.
- Listed height: 6 ft 9 in (2.06 m)
- Listed weight: 244 lb (111 kg)

Career information
- High school: Mountain Brook (Mountain Brook, Alabama)
- College: LSU (2019–2021)
- NBA draft: 2021: undrafted
- Playing career: 2021–present

Career history
- 2021–2023: Portland Trail Blazers
- 2023–2025: Brooklyn Nets
- 2025–2026: Philadelphia 76ers
- 2026–present: New Orleans Pelicans

Career highlights
- First-team All-SEC – AP (2021); Second-team All-SEC – Coaches (2021); SEC All-Freshman Team (2020); McDonald's All-American (2019); 2× Alabama Mr. Basketball (2018, 2019)
- Stats at NBA.com
- Stats at Basketball Reference

Trendon Nelson Watford (born November 9, 2000) is an American professional basketball player for the New Orleans Pelicans of the National Basketball Association (NBA). Watford was a standout high school player in Birmingham, Alabama, winning both Alabama Mr. Basketball and Alabama Gatorade Player of the Year twice. A McDonald's All-American and consensus five-star recruit, he was one of the top players of the 2019 class. After playing two seasons of college basketball for LSU, Watford signed a two-way contract with the Portland Trail Blazers as an undrafted free agent in 2021.

His contract was converted to a standard contract in 2022, and he played two seasons with the Trail Blazers before being waived in 2023. That summer, he signed with the Brooklyn Nets, where he played for two seasons. Watford joined the Philadelphia 76ers in 2025, where he reunited with his friend Tyrese Maxey and made the playoffs for the first time in his career. In 2026, he signed with the New Orleans Pelicans.

== Early life ==
Watford was born in Birmingham, Alabama, to Ernest and Belinda Watford. His older brother, Christian, played for Indiana for four years before becoming a professional basketball player. Trendon is nine years younger than Christian, and he attended all of his brother's home games throughout the four years at Indiana, driving the seven hours from Birmingham to Bloomington. In addition to attending games, Watford also saw closed practices and pregame, halftime, and postgame speeches, leading his brother to remark that "Trendon owned that place". His older sister, Elise, played volleyball at Samford University. Watford was very close to his uncle, Stanley "Kidd" Glover, who died of lung cancer in 2020. He credits his uncle for his competitive drive, and writes "RIP Unc Kidd" on his shoes. Always the biggest player on his team, Watford was coached by his father Ernest, who played him on the perimeter instead of positioning him near the post, and had his son do thousands of ballhandling drills. Watford was named to his high school honor roll.

== High school career ==
Watford played high school basketball for Mountain Brook High School. A highly touted five star prospect, Watford holds many Alabama state records, including the Alabama High School Athletic Association's career rebounding record. He led Mountain Brook to three consecutive state championships from 2017 to 2019, being named Class 7A State Tournament MVP in all three of those years. He won back-to-back Gatorade Player of the Year awards for Alabama boys' basketball in 2018 and 2019, and was a finalist for the national award in the latter year after averaging 23.7 points, 11.2 rebounds, 3.6 assists, 2.5 blocks, and 2.1 steals. He was named to the McDonald's All-American Game and Jordan Brand Classic. He averaged 17 points and 8 rebounds on the Nike Elite Youth Basketball League circuit.

=== Recruiting ===
A top-15 prospect in the class of 2019 and ranked as the No. 6 power forward and the No. 1 recruit from Alabama by ESPN, Watford's final list included LSU, Alabama, Memphis, and Indiana, where his older brother Christian had played, with the first three, all of which he visited, being the front-runners. On May 20, 2019, he committed to Will Wade and LSU. At the time of his commitment, Watford was considered a one-and-done prospect for the 2020 NBA draft, and was ranked No. 15 in ESPN's mock draft.

College recruiting
Name	Hometown	School	Height	Weight	Commit date
Trendon Watford; PF	Birmingham, AL	Mountain Brook (AL)	6 ft 8 in (2.03 m)	210 lb (95 kg)	May 20, 2019
Trendon Watford; PF	Recruit ratings: Rivals: 247Sports: ESPN: (93)				
Overall recruit ranking: Rivals: 16 247Sports: 19 ESPN: 19
Note: In many cases, Scout, Rivals, 247Sports, On3, and ESPN may conflict in their listings of height and weight.; In these cases, the average was taken. ESPN grades are on a 100-point scale.; Sources: "LSU 2019 Basketball Commitments". Rivals.; "2019 LSU Tigers Recruiting Class". ESPN.; "2019 Team Ranking". Rivals.

== College career ==
Heading into his freshman season, Watford was one of the 20 players named to the Karl Malone Award watchlist for the top collegiate power forward in the nation. In his debut for LSU, an 88–79 win over Bowling Green, Watford scored 10 points. He had his first double double in college on November 19, 2019, scoring 12 points and grabbing 12 rebounds as LSU defeated UMBC 77–50. Watford scored a career-high 22 points on January 25, 2020, in a 69–67 win over Texas. At the conclusion of the regular season, Watford was named to the SEC All-Freshman Team. His strong performance in the SEC tournament led to his being monitored by the Portland Trail Blazers' director of data science, Zach Williams. He averaged 13.6 points and 7.2 rebounds for LSU as a freshman. Following the season, Watford declared for the 2020 NBA draft. On August 3, Watford announced he was returning to LSU for his sophomore season. He scored a career-high 30 points in a SEC Tournament championship game loss to Alabama. Watford averaged 16.3 points and 7.4 rebounds per game as a sophomore. In two NCAA tournament games, he averaged 11.0 points and 7.5 rebounds, and was named to the All-SEC First Team. Following the season, he declared for the 2021 NBA draft and hired an agent, thus forgoing his college eligibility.

== Professional career ==
=== Portland Trail Blazers (2021–2023) ===
Heading into the 2021 NBA draft, Watford expected to be picked in the middle of the second round after working out for 11 teams. During the draft, no team expressed interest in him until the Brooklyn Nets, who held the second-to-last pick of the draft, which his brother Christian cautioned against. After he went undrafted, Portland Trail Blazers head coach Chauncey Billups, who had not held a pick in the draft, called Watford and expressed interest in signing him to a two-way contract. The call was Billups's first in an official role as Blazers head coach. Watford promised Billups "that he was going to come [to Portland] and work his butt off". Watford was signed by the Blazers to a two-way contract on August 3, 2021.

After participating in Summer League in Las Vegas, Billups recommended he lose weight, and Watford worked with his trainer to improve his conditioning. His focus impressed Billups, and he began to earn minutes early in the 2021–22 season after not playing in 18 of the team's first 20 games. In January 2022, the Blazers suffered injuries to their frontcourt, and Watford's versatility as a backup big man led to an increase in minutes. By February, he had played in 22 consecutive games, averaging 5.5 points, 3.6 rebounds, and 1.2 assists in 15.3 minutes of playing time. His contract was converted to a standard deal on February 21, 2022. This deal was a four-year contact with the first two years guaranteed. Up to that point, he led all rookies with a field goal percentage of 59%, and ranked second in blocks, third in rebounds, fourth in games played, and fifth in points among two-way contract players. On March 12, he scored a career-high 27 points, along with six rebounds, in a 127–118 win over the Washington Wizards. Watford had a standout month of March, averaging 15.4 points, 6.7 rebounds, and 3.4 assists during the month prior to suffering a hyperextended left knee on March 26. During March, the Blazers had been tanking, which led Watford to play 31.5 minutes per game. The injury, which led to a bone contusion, ended his rookie season.

On July 17, 2022, Watford put up 19 points, seven rebounds, two assists, three steals, and one block to lead the Blazers to an 85–77 win over the New York Knicks in the 2022 NBA Summer League championship match. He was later named the Summer League Championship Game MVP. Watford was also named to the All-NBA Summer League Second Team. Heading into the 2022–23 season, Watford was named by The Ringer as a prospect who had "shown some flashes" but could play a bigger role in the future. Watford suffered a hip flexor strain in training camp in September and aggravated it during the preseason. He missed his first eight games with the injury before returning in a November 5 loss to the Phoenix Suns. He played inconsistently in January, participating in only eight games, but gained a bigger role from February onward, averaging 10.5 points, 4.5 rebounds, and 3.0 assists for the remainder of the season. The Oregonian praised his energy and competitiveness.

For most of the 2022–23 season, Watford played backup center behind Jusuf Nurkić and Drew Eubanks, and backup power forward behind Jerami Grant and Justise Winslow, but made an impact with his spirit in the locker room, playing a "glue guy" role both on and off the court. With the Blazers eliminated from playoff contention by the end of the season, Watford earned more playing time, starting at power forward several times, which helped expand his game. Due to his playmaking and connecting ability, Watford was considered an important part of the Blazers' future along with rookie Shaedon Sharpe. On June 30, 2023, Watford was waived by the Trail Blazers.

=== Brooklyn Nets (2023–2025) ===
On August 3, 2023, Watford signed with the Brooklyn Nets. He wore number 9 in Brooklyn. Then-head coach Jacque Vaughn played Watford at the point guard position behind Spencer Dinwiddie, despite Watford having mainly played power forward and center during his time in Portland. He credits Brooklyn for unlocking and expanding his game. Entering restricted free agency, Watford accepted a qualifying offer to make him an unrestricted free agent at the end of the next season, re-signing with Brooklyn on July 9, 2024.

During the 2024–25 season, new head coach Jordi Fernández continued playing Watford at the point forward position due to his court vision and versatility. Fernández often ran post up plays involving Watford, and he had the best season of his career, averaging career highs of 10.2 points and 2.6 assists per game. Watford suffered a left hamstring strain in training camp, which was the first of several left hamstring strains that kept him out of all but 17 of his first 52 games. The midseason trade of Dennis Schröder to the Golden State Warriors gave more primary ballhandling duties to Watford, who was successful in a larger role. Though the acquisition of D'Angelo Russell gave Brooklyn a new starting point guard, Watford's ballhandling decreased, but he continued strong playmaking from the power forward position. After the Nets traded Ben Simmons at the trade deadline, Watford was anticipated to replace most of Simmons's playmaking. Watford usually came off the bench during Brooklyn's rebuilding season in which they won only 26 games, playing at power forward behind Dorian Finney-Smith and Noah Clowney and at center behind Nic Claxton and Day'Ron Sharpe, but he performed well during his starts, averaging 14.8 points, 5.5 rebounds, and 4.2 assists per game.

In a game against the Indiana Pacers on March 21, 2025, Watford was ejected and later fined $35,000 after an altercation in which he shoved Pacers players Andrew Nembhard and Myles Turner. Tasked with creating more for himself and others, Watford's usage increased considerably in his second season in Brooklyn, and he played a career-high 20.8 minutes per game, but injuries limited him to a career-low 44 games. After the season, Watford entered free agency for the second year in a row, and he stated in his exit interview that he wanted to get what he deserved. The Nets chose not to re-sign Watford after the season, which was criticized for adding pressure on rookies such as Egor Dëmin.

=== Philadelphia 76ers (2025–2026) ===
On July 2, 2025, Watford signed a two-year, $5.3 million contract with the Philadelphia 76ers. Head coach Nick Nurse had originally wanted to acquire Watford in a trade from the Nets the previous season before signing him in free agency. Watford was longtime friends with the team's star point guard Tyrese Maxey; they had talked on the phone the day free agency opened, hoping to soon play on the same team. His signing was praised by The New York Times as "one of the more effective signings on the margins a team can make". Watford replaced Guerschon Yabusele, who left that summer in free agency; and provided size, length, versatility, and playmaking for the 76ers, with his teammate and friend Quentin Grimes calling him a "Swiss Army knife". He was expected to reduce the team's dependence on its backcourt for capable ballhandling and on their often-injured center Joel Embiid for size and rebounding. As the only primary power forward on the 76ers' roster, he was expected to often receive playing opportunities as a key reserve off the bench.

Watford suffered a hamstring injury in a September pick-up game, missing the entirety of the 76ers' training camp and preseason, and the first three games of the regular season. Due to his lack of chemistry with his teammates from the injury, Watford had a slow start to the season, scoring only two points in his debut on October 28. In his first game against his former Nets team on November 2, Watford continued to return to form, with an efficient 16 points, nine rebounds, and seven assists. Nurse maximized Watford's versatility by playing him as a point forward with the ball in his hands. On November 8, Watford recorded his first career triple-double in a 130–120 win over the Toronto Raptors, putting up 20 points, ten assists, and seventeen rebounds. Following the game, Embiid compared Watford to Ben Simmons. The game was his first start of the season, and began a short stint as Philadelphia's starting power forward. On November 25 against the Orlando Magic, Watford suffered a left adductor strain and was expected to be out for at least two weeks. He returned to the lineup against the Washington Wizards on January 7, 2026. Watford initially had trouble returning to the rotation, but Paul George's 25-game suspension for drug-related issues allowed him to earn a bigger role and more playing time in February. However, by April, he had fallen from the rotation again.

With the team affected by injuries in the early part of the season, Watford's ability to create for himself and others allowed him to handle the ball more and free Maxey to play off the ball. However, as the 76ers returned to health later in the season, Watford's ball-handling skills were used less as more capable ball handlers such as Embiid and Paul George returned from injury, and his lack of off-ball contributions limited his utility, as the 76ers had a −10.7 net rating when he played alongside their starting backcourt of Maxey and VJ Edgecombe. Due in part to his friendship with Maxey, Watford was a positive locker room presence, but poor shooting and defense combined with the hamstring and adductor injuries prevented him from establishing a consistent rotation role for the 76ers.

For the season, Watford averaged 6.5 points, 3.3 rebounds, and 2.5 assists in 53 games, at the end of the Philadelphia rotation. He scored efficiently on shots within 10 feet of the basket, which made up most of his shots, but struggled to shoot from long range, with a three-point percentage of only 20%. The 76ers qualified for the playoffs for the first time in Watford's career, but he was out of Nurse's playoff rotation, and saw little playing time compared to the starters and younger reserves such as Dominick Barlow and Justin Edwards. The 76ers were criticized for using so many roster spots on "non-contributors" such as Watford. On June 29, 2026, the 76ers declined Watford's team option for the next season, making him an unrestricted free agent. After his option was declined, Watford posted the Future song "Ain't Coming Back" on his Instagram story. In free agency, Watford explored playing opportunities elsewhere, including a reported deal offered to him in Spain by Valencia Basket. Via social media, Watford stated the report was false and he would be staying in the NBA.

=== New Orleans Pelicans (2026–present) ===
On August 17, 2026, Watford signed a one-year, $2.9 million minimum contract with the New Orleans Pelicans, described by ESPN's Shams Charania as a "productive two-way get". The deal, which brought the Pelicans to their full 15 players under contract, was the biggest signing of a mostly inactive offseason for the team. Watford was expected to play a veteran reserve role behind Zion Williamson and Derik Queen, but could expand if either player was injured or if trades changed the New Orleans roster. Watford's signing raised questions for the Pelicans, as they continued to lack a legitimate starting center, and his lack of shooting ability was similar to Williamson and Queen. The Pelicans were expected to play lineups with Watford as a small-ball center, allowing the team to use his connective playmaking ability.

== Player profile ==
Listed at 6 feet 8 inches (2.03 m) and 245 pounds (111 kg), with a wingspan of 7 feet 2 inches (2.18 m), Watford is a versatile playmaker, connector, and shot-creator, with skilled scoring ability in the post. His unorthodox play style has been described as resembling that of a guard more than his listed position of power forward, and he most often plays as a point forward. He can also be deployed as a small-ball center who excels in the paint, especially from the floater range. He has the unique ability to both bring the ball up the court like a point guard, and post up like a center. His ability to be a connector and ball mover has been compared to Nicolas Batum. Watford is known for his competitiveness and toughness, and his hustle was the main factor behind his entry into the Portland rotation off of a two-way contract. He excels in transition offense, where his ball-handling ability allows him to push the pace and exploit mismatches near the basket. On March 6, 2026, while playing for the 76ers, Watford commented on his versatility:

I just try to go along with it. It's not a bad thing, being able to play a lot of positions... Some games I might come in at the four, backup four. Some games I might come in at the one. Some games I might come in [and replace Kelly Oubre Jr.] at the three. It just varies, and obviously it's a good thing to be able to play a lot of positions. But my job is to just stay locked in and be ready whenever my name is called, whatever position it may be.

One of Watford's main weaknesses is shooting. Never a high-volume three-point shooter, Watford shot only 20% from three with the 76ers, which limits his usefulness when not handling the ball, although he increased his three-point volume in each of the preceding four seasons. Though a switchable defender, Watford is less skilled at the point of attack, and does not have a major presence defensively or in rebounding. He also struggles to stay healthy, often suffering injuries.

== Career statistics ==
Legend
GP	Games played	GS	Games started	MPG	Minutes per game
FG%	Field goal percentage	3P%	3-point field goal percentage	FT%	Free throw percentage
RPG	Rebounds per game	APG	Assists per game	SPG	Steals per game
BPG	Blocks per game	PPG	Points per game	**Bold**	Career high

=== NBA ===
==== Regular season ====
Year	Team	GP	GS	MPG	FG%	3P%	FT%	RPG	APG	SPG	BPG	PPG
2021–22	Portland	48	10	18.1	.532	.237	.755	**4.1**	1.7	.5	**.6**	7.6
2022–23	Portland	62	**12**	19.1	**.560**	.391	.720	3.8	2.1	.5	.2	7.4
2023–24	Brooklyn	**63**	2	13.6	.527	**.397**	**.794**	3.1	1.3	.4	.3	6.9
2024–25	Brooklyn	44	6	**20.8**	.469	.330	.762	3.6	**2.6**	**.6**	.3	**10.2**
2025–26	Philadelphia	53	7	16.3	.515	.200	.779	3.3	2.5	.3	.4	6.5
Career		270	37	17.3	.519	.325	.761	3.6	2.0	.5	.3	7.6

==== Playoffs ====
Year	Team	GP	GS	MPG	FG%	3P%	FT%	RPG	APG	SPG	BPG	PPG
2026	Philadelphia	7	0	5.7	.636	.000	.750	.4	.4	.4	.0	2.9
Career		7	0	5.7	.636	.000	.750	.4	.4	.4	.0	2.9

=== College ===
Year	Team	GP	GS	MPG	FG%	3P%	FT%	RPG	APG	SPG	BPG	PPG
2019–20	LSU	**31**	**30**	31.6	**.489**	.269	**.674**	7.2	1.7	.9	**.7**	13.6
2020–21	LSU	28	28	**34.6**	.480	**.316**	.651	**7.4**	**2.9**	**1.1**	.6	**16.3**
Career		59	58	33.0	.484	.290	.662	7.3	2.3	1.0	.7	14.9
