= 2021–22 Los Angeles Clippers season =

NBA Sports team season

- Head coach: Tyronn Lue
- General manager: Michael Winger
- Owner: Steve Ballmer
- Arena: Crypto.com Arena (Note: Formerly the Staples Center until December 24, 2021)

Results
- Record: 42–40 (.512)
- Place: Division: 3rd (Pacific); Conference: 8th (Western)
- Playoff finish: Did not qualify
- Stats at Basketball Reference

Local media
- Television: Bally Sports West; Bally Sports SoCal
- Radio: KLAC

The 2021–22 Los Angeles Clippers season was the 52nd season of the franchise in the National Basketball Association (NBA), their 44th season in Southern California and their 38th season in Los Angeles. The Clippers qualified for the postseason via the play-in, but failed to reach the playoffs for the first time since 2018 after being defeated by both the Minnesota Timberwolves and the New Orleans Pelicans in the play-in tournament, who coincidentally made their first playoff appearances since 2018. It is also the first time in Kawhi Leonard's career that his team missed the playoffs, however, he did not feature at all for the Clippers during the season due to injury.

== Draft ==
| Round | Pick | Player | Position | Nationality | College |
|---|---|---|---|---|---|
| 1 | 25 | Quentin Grimes | SG | United States | Houston |

The Clippers entered this draft with their own first-round pick. They had traded their original second-round pick to the Charlotte Hornets in 2018 as an exchange for the draft rights to future MVP Shai Gilgeous-Alexander.

== Roster ==
2021–22 Los Angeles Clippers roster
Players

| Pos. | No. | Player | Height | Weight | DOB | From |
|---|---|---|---|---|---|---|
| G/F | 33 | Nicolas Batum | 6 ft 8 in (2.03 m) | 230 lb (104 kg) | 1988-12-14 | France |
| G | 4 | Brandon Boston | 6 ft 6 in (1.98 m) | 188 lb (85 kg) | 2001-11-28 | Kentucky |
| G/F | 7 | Amir Coffey | 6 ft 7 in (2.01 m) | 210 lb (95 kg) | 1997-06-17 | Minnesota |
| F | 23 | Robert Covington | 6 ft 7 in (2.01 m) | 209 lb (95 kg) | 1990-12-14 | Tennessee State |
| G/F | 13 | Paul George (injured) | 6 ft 8 in (2.03 m) | 220 lb (100 kg) | 1990-05-02 | Fresno State |
| C | 55 | Isaiah Hartenstein | 7 ft 0 in (2.13 m) | 250 lb (113 kg) | 1998-05-05 | Germany |
| G/F | 22 | Rodney Hood | 6 ft 8 in (2.03 m) | 208 lb (94 kg) | 1992-10-20 | Duke |
| G | 1 | Reggie Jackson | 6 ft 2 in (1.88 m) | 208 lb (94 kg) | 1990-04-16 | Boston College |
| G | 5 | Luke Kennard | 6 ft 5 in (1.96 m) | 206 lb (93 kg) | 1996-06-24 | Duke |
| F | 2 | Kawhi Leonard (injured) | 6 ft 7 in (2.01 m) | 225 lb (102 kg) | 1991-06-29 | San Diego State |
| G/F | 14 | Terance Mann | 6 ft 5 in (1.96 m) | 215 lb (98 kg) | 1996-10-18 | Florida State |
| G | 15 | Xavier Moon (TW) | 6 ft 2 in (1.88 m) | 165 lb (75 kg) | 1995-01-02 | Morehead State |
| F | 8 | Marcus Morris | 6 ft 8 in (2.03 m) | 218 lb (99 kg) | 1989-09-02 | Kansas |
| G | 24 | Norman Powell | 6 ft 3 in (1.91 m) | 215 lb (98 kg) | 1989-05-25 | UCLA |
| G | 17 | Jason Preston (injured) | 6 ft 3 in (1.91 m) | 181 lb (82 kg) | 1999-08-10 | Ohio |
| G | 0 | Jay Scrubb (injured) (TW) | 6 ft 5 in (1.96 m) | 220 lb (100 kg) | 2000-09-01 | John A. Logan |
| C | 40 | Ivica Zubac | 7 ft 0 in (2.13 m) | 240 lb (109 kg) | 1997-03-18 | Croatia |

Coaches
Head coach
- Tyronn Lue
Assistant(s)
- Brian Shaw
- Jay Larranaga
- Jeremy Castleberry
- Dan Craig (associate HC)
- Larry Drew
- Brendan O'Connor

Legend
- (DP) Unsigned draft pick
- (FA) Free agent
- (S) Suspended
- (GL) On assignment to G League affiliate
- (TW) Two-way affiliate player
- Injured

Roster
Updated: April 15, 2022

=== Roster notes ===
- Point guard Jason Preston missed the entire season due to a right foot injury.
- Small forward Kawhi Leonard missed the entire season due to a knee injury.
- Point guard Eric Bledsoe made his second tour of duty with team having played for them from 2010 to 2013. He played in 54 games before getting traded away in February.

== Standings ==
=== Division ===
| Pacific Division | W | L | PCT | GB | Home | Road | Div | GP |
|---|---|---|---|---|---|---|---|---|
| z – Phoenix Suns | 64 | 18 | .780 | – | 32‍–‍9 | 32‍–‍9 | 10–6 | 82 |
| x – Golden State Warriors | 53 | 29 | .646 | 11.0 | 31‍–‍10 | 22‍–‍19 | 12–4 | 82 |
| pi – Los Angeles Clippers | 42 | 40 | .512 | 22.0 | 25‍–‍16 | 17‍–‍24 | 9–7 | 82 |
| Los Angeles Lakers | 33 | 49 | .402 | 31.0 | 21‍–‍20 | 12‍–‍29 | 3–13 | 82 |
| Sacramento Kings | 30 | 52 | .366 | 34.0 | 16‍–‍25 | 14‍–‍27 | 6–10 | 82 |

=== Conference ===
Western Conference
| # | Team | W | L | PCT | GB | GP |
|---|---|---|---|---|---|---|
| 1 | z – Phoenix Suns * | 64 | 18 | .780 | – | 82 |
| 2 | y – Memphis Grizzlies * | 56 | 26 | .683 | 8.0 | 82 |
| 3 | x – Golden State Warriors | 53 | 29 | .646 | 11.0 | 82 |
| 4 | x – Dallas Mavericks | 52 | 30 | .634 | 12.0 | 82 |
| 5 | y – Utah Jazz * | 49 | 33 | .598 | 15.0 | 82 |
| 6 | x – Denver Nuggets | 48 | 34 | .585 | 16.0 | 82 |
| 7 | x – Minnesota Timberwolves | 46 | 36 | .561 | 18.0 | 82 |
| 8 | pi – Los Angeles Clippers | 42 | 40 | .512 | 22.0 | 82 |
| 9 | x – New Orleans Pelicans | 36 | 46 | .439 | 28.0 | 82 |
| 10 | pi − San Antonio Spurs | 34 | 48 | .415 | 30.0 | 82 |
| 11 | Los Angeles Lakers | 33 | 49 | .402 | 31.0 | 82 |
| 12 | Sacramento Kings | 30 | 52 | .366 | 34.0 | 82 |
| 13 | Portland Trail Blazers | 27 | 55 | .329 | 37.0 | 82 |
| 14 | Oklahoma City Thunder | 24 | 58 | .293 | 40.0 | 82 |
| 15 | Houston Rockets | 20 | 62 | .244 | 44.0 | 82 |

== Game log ==
=== Preseason ===
2021 preseason game log
Total: 1–3 (Home: 1–2; Road: 0–1)
Preseason: 1–3 (home: 1–2; road: 0–1)

| Game | Date | Team | Score | High points | High rebounds | High assists | Location Attendance | Record |
|---|---|---|---|---|---|---|---|---|
| 1 | October 4 | Denver | W 103–102 | Terance Mann (14) | Harry Giles III (12) | Terance Mann (5) | Staples Center; 7,825 | 1–0 |
| 2 | October 6 | Sacramento | L 98–113 | Brandon Boston Jr. (20) | Brandon Boston Jr. (7) | Eric Bledsoe (4) | Staples Center; 8,122 | 1–1 |
| 3 | October 8 | @ Dallas | L 114–122 | Luke Kennard (19) | Giles III, Hartenstein (8) | George, Hartenstein (5) | American Airlines Center; 17,853 | 1–2 |
| 4 | October 11 | Minnesota | L 100–128 | Luke Kennard (18) | Ivica Zubac (9) | Eric Bledsoe (5) | Toyota Arena; 4,850 | 1–3 |

2021–22 preseason schedule

=== Regular season ===
2021–22 game log
Total: 42–40 (Home: 25–16; Road: 17–24)
October: 1–4 (home: 1–2; road: 0–2)

| Game | Date | Team | Score | High points | High rebounds | High assists | Location Attendance | Record |
|---|---|---|---|---|---|---|---|---|
| 1 | October 21 | @ Golden State | L 113–115 | Paul George (29) | Paul George (11) | George, Jackson (6) | Chase Center; 18,064 | 0–1 |
| 2 | October 23 | Memphis | L 114–120 | Paul George (41) | Paul George (10) | Eric Bledsoe (7) | Staples Center; 16,748 | 0–2 |
| 3 | October 25 | Portland | W 116–86 | Luke Kennard (23) | Ivica Zubac (8) | Eric Bledsoe (7) | Staples Center; 15,672 | 1–2 |
| 4 | October 27 | Cleveland | L 79–92 | Batum, Jackson (16) | Paul George (10) | Bledsoe, Jackson, Kennard, Mann (3) | Staples Center; 13,276 | 1–3 |
| 5 | October 29 | @ Portland | L 92–111 | Paul George (42) | Nicolas Batum (9) | Jackson, Mann (4) | Moda Center; 16,510 | 1–4 |

November: 10–6 (home: 8–4; road: 2–2)

| Game | Date | Team | Score | High points | High rebounds | High assists | Location Attendance | Record |
|---|---|---|---|---|---|---|---|---|
| 6 | November 1 | Oklahoma City | W 99–94 | Paul George (32) | Isaiah Hartenstein (12) | Paul George (7) | Staples Center; 13,722 | 2–4 |
| 7 | November 3 | @ Minnesota | W 126–115 | Paul George (32) | George, Zubac (6) | George, Jackson (8) | Target Center; 15,386 | 3–4 |
| 8 | November 5 | @ Minnesota | W 104–84 | Paul George (21) | Ivica Zubac (14) | Paul George (6) | Target Center; 17,136 | 4–4 |
| 9 | November 7 | Charlotte | W 120–106 | Paul George (20) | Ivica Zubac (11) | Paul George (8) | Staples Center; 15,781 | 5–4 |
| 10 | November 9 | Portland | W 117–109 | Paul George (24) | Paul George (9) | Paul George (7) | Staples Center; 14,131 | 6–4 |
| 11 | November 11 | Miami | W 112–109 | Paul George (27) | Ivica Zubac (11) | Paul George (5) | Staples Center; 16,150 | 7–4 |
| 12 | November 13 | Minnesota | W 129–102 | Paul George (23) | Hartenstein, Zubac (12) | Eric Bledsoe (9) | Staples Center; 15,285 | 8–4 |
| 13 | November 14 | Chicago | L 90–100 | Paul George (27) | Paul George (11) | Paul George (4) | Staples Center; 17,899 | 8–5 |
| 14 | November 16 | San Antonio | W 106–92 | Paul George (34) | Paul George (13) | George, Jackson (4) | Staples Center; 13,298 | 9–5 |
| 15 | November 18 | @ Memphis | L 108–120 | Paul George (23) | Ivica Zubac (7) | Paul George (6) | FedExForum; 13,419 | 9–6 |
| 16 | November 19 | @ New Orleans | L 81–94 | Paul George (19) | Ivica Zubac (11) | Paul George (6) | Smoothie King Center; 15,274 | 9–7 |
| 17 | November 21 | Dallas | W 97–91 | Paul George (29) | Ivica Zubac (10) | Paul George (6) | Staples Center; 17,149 | 10–7 |
| 18 | November 23 | Dallas | L 104–112 (OT) | Reggie Jackson (31) | Paul George (6) | Reggie Jackson (10) | Staples Center; 17,067 | 10–8 |
| 19 | November 26 | Detroit | W 107–96 | Reggie Jackson (21) | Ivica Zubac (13) | George, Jackson, Kennard (4) | Staples Center; 18,139 | 11–8 |
| 20 | November 28 | Golden State | L 90–105 | Paul George (30) | Eric Bledsoe (10) | George, Morris (5) | Staples Center; 19,068 | 11–9 |
| 21 | November 29 | New Orleans | L 104–123 | Paul George (27) | Terance Mann (7) | Terance Mann (5) | Staples Center; 15,691 | 11–10 |

December: 7–8 (home: 3–3; road: 4–5)

| Game | Date | Team | Score | High points | High rebounds | High assists | Location Attendance | Record |
|---|---|---|---|---|---|---|---|---|
| 22 | December 1 | Sacramento | L 115–124 | Kennard, Mann (19) | Isaiah Hartenstein (8) | Reggie Jackson (6) | Staples Center; 17,217 | 11–11 |
| 23 | December 3 | @ L. A. Lakers | W 119–115 | Marcus Morris (21) | Paul George (8) | Paul George (9) | Staples Center; 18,997 | 12–11 |
| 24 | December 4 | @ Sacramento | L 99–104 | Marcus Morris (21) | Ivica Zubac (11) | Paul George (10) | Golden 1 Center; 15,004 | 12–12 |
| 25 | December 6 | @ Portland | W 102–90 | Paul George (21) | Paul George (8) | Reggie Jackson (6) | Moda Center; 15,865 | 13–12 |
| 26 | December 8 | Boston | W 114–111 | Brandon Boston Jr. (27) | Mann, Zubac (10) | Reggie Jackson (7) | Staples Center; 17,064 | 14–12 |
| 27 | December 11 | Orlando | W 106–104 | Reggie Jackson (25) | Terance Mann (9) | Bledsoe, Hartenstein, Kennard (5) | Staples Center; 17,156 | 15–12 |
| 28 | December 13 | Phoenix | W 111–95 | Marcus Morris (24) | Marcus Morris (11) | Isaiah Hartenstein (7) | Staples Center; 17,909 | 16–12 |
| 29 | December 15 | @ Utah | L 103–124 | Marcus Morris (24) | Marcus Morris (8) | Reggie Jackson (9) | Vivint Arena; 18,306 | 16–13 |
| 30 | December 18 | @ Oklahoma | L 103–104 | Luke Kennard (27) | Justise Winslow (9) | Reggie Jackson (10) | Paycom Center; 15,123 | 16–14 |
| 31 | December 20 | San Antonio | L 92–116 | Paul George (25) | Ivica Zubac (12) | Paul George (6) | Staples Center; 18,096 | 16–15 |
| 32 | December 22 | @ Sacramento | W 105–89 | Eric Bledsoe (19) | Eric Bledsoe (8) | Eric Bledsoe (7) | Golden 1 Center; 15,386 | 17–15 |
| 33 | December 26 | Denver | L 100–103 | Bledsoe, Boston Jr. (18) | Ivica Zubac (11) | Eric Bledsoe (10) | Crypto.com Arena; 17,759 | 17–16 |
| 34 | December 27 | Brooklyn | L 108–124 | Marcus Morris (25) | Winslow, Zubac (9) | Bledsoe, Morris (6) | Crypto.com Arena; 17,128 | 17–17 |
| 35 | December 29 | Boston | W 91–82 | Marcus Morris (23) | Ivica Zubac (14) | Bledsoe, Kennard (4) | TD Garden; 19,156 | 18–17 |
| 36 | December 31 | @ Toronto | L 108–116 | Marcus Morris (20) | Terance Mann (11) | Bledsoe, Kennard (6) | Scotiabank Arena; 0 | 18–18 |

January: 8–9 (home: 3–2; road: 5–7)

| Game | Date | Team | Score | High points | High rebounds | High assists | Location Attendance | Record |
|---|---|---|---|---|---|---|---|---|
| 37 | January 1 | @ Brooklyn | W 120–116 | Eric Bledsoe (27) | Amir Coffey (8) | Amir Coffey (5) | Barclays Center; 17,732 | 19–18 |
| 38 | January 3 | Minnesota | L 104–122 | Serge Ibaka (17) | Amir Coffey (5) | Eric Bledsoe (5) | Crypto.com Arena; 15,959 | 19–19 |
| 39 | January 6 | @ Phoenix | L 89–106 | Marcus Morris (26) | Jackson, Morris (8) | Terance Mann (4) | Footprint Center; 17,071 | 19–20 |
| 40 | January 8 | Memphis | L 108–123 | Marcus Morris (29) | Mann, Morris (8) | Amir Coffey (3) | Crypto.com Arena; 17,936 | 19–21 |
| 41 | January 9 | Atlanta | W 106–93 | Amir Coffey (21) | Ivica Zubac (13) | Eric Bledsoe (7) | Crypto.com Arena; 14,836 | 20–21 |
| 42 | January 11 | Denver | W 87–85 | Amir Coffey (18) | Serge Ibaka (9) | Eric Bledsoe (9) | Crypto.com Arena; 15,077 | 21–21 |
| 43 | January 13 | @ New Orleans | L 89–113 | Terance Mann (15) | Coffey, Ibaka, Jackson (6) | Amir Coffey (5) | Smoothie King Center; 15,406 | 21–22 |
| 44 | January 15 | @ San Antonio | L 94–101 | Amir Coffey (20) | Serge Ibaka (10) | Bledsoe, Morris (5) | AT&T Center; 13,223 | 21–23 |
| 45 | January 17 | Indiana | W 139–133 | Nicolas Batum (32) | Marcus Morris (8) | Amir Coffey (7) | Crypto.com Arena; 15,080 | 22–23 |
| 46 | January 19 | @ Denver | L 128–130 (OT) | Ivica Zubac (32) | Ivica Zubac (10) | Reggie Jackson (12) | Ball Arena; 14,547 | 22–24 |
| 47 | January 21 | @ Philadelphia | W 102–101 | Reggie Jackson (19) | Ivica Zubac (10) | Reggie Jackson (9) | Wells Fargo Center; 20,182 | 23–24 |
| 48 | January 23 | @ New York | L 102–110 | Reggie Jackson (26) | Ivica Zubac (14) | Eric Bledsoe (6) | Madison Square Garden; 19,812 | 23–25 |
| 49 | January 25 | @ Washington | W 116–115 | Amir Coffey (29) | Luke Kennard (8) | Kennard, Hartenstein (6) | Capital One Arena; 13,544 | 24–25 |
| 50 | January 26 | @ Orlando | W 111–102 | Amir Coffey (19) | Nicolas Batum (8) | Amir Coffey (5) | Amway Center; 12,448 | 25–25 |
| 51 | January 28 | @ Miami | L 114–121 | Luke Kennard (23) | Justise Winslow (10) | Eric Bledsoe (6) | FTX Arena; 19,600 | 25–26 |
| 52 | January 30 | @ Charlotte | W 115–90 | Jackson, Boston Jr (19) | Zubac, Kennard (10) | Reggie Jackson (5) | Spectrum Center; 18,674 | 26–26 |
| 53 | January 31 | @ Indiana | L 116–122 | Amir Coffey (27) | Serge Ibaka (11) | Reggie Jackson (5) | Gainbridge Fieldhouse; 14,629 | 26–27 |

February: 6–4 (home: 3–1; road: 3–3)

| Game | Date | Team | Score | High points | High rebounds | High assists | Location Attendance | Record |
|---|---|---|---|---|---|---|---|---|
| 54 | February 3 | L.A. Lakers | W 111–110 | Marcus Morris (29) | Serge Ibaka (9) | Eric Bledsoe (7) | Crypto.com Arena; 19,068 | 27–27 |
| 55 | February 6 | Milwaukee | L 113–137 | Norman Powell (28) | Marcus Morris (8) | Jackson, Mann (5) | Crypto.com Arena; 17,395 | 27–28 |
| 56 | February 8 | @ Memphis | L 109–135 | Isaiah Hartenstein (19) | Hartenstein, Zubac (7) | Terance Mann (7) | FedEx Forum; 16,101 | 27–29 |
| 57 | February 10 | @ Dallas | L 105–112 | Marcus Morris (21) | Norman Powell (6) | Reggie Jackson (8) | American Airlines Center; 19,532 | 27–30 |
| 58 | February 12 | @ Dallas | W 99–97 | Reggie Jackson (24) | Ivica Zubac (10) | Reggie Jackson (8) | American Airlines Center; 20,028 | 28–30 |
| 59 | February 14 | Golden State | W 119–104 | Terance Mann (25) | Zubac, Jackson, Batum (8) | Reggie Jackson (9) | Crypto.com Arena; 19,068 | 29–30 |
| 60 | February 15 | @ Phoenix | L 96–103 | Marcus Morris (23) | Ivica Zubac (13) | Reggie Jackson (8) | Footprint Center; 17,071 | 29–31 |
| 61 | February 17 | Houston | W 142–111 | Marcus Morris (27) | Ivica Zubac (10) | Reggie Jackson (14) | Crypto.com Arena; 17,519 | 30–31 |
All-Star Break
| 62 | February 25 | @ L.A. Lakers | W 105–102 | Terance Mann (19) | Terance Mann (10) | Jackson, Hartenstein (6) | Crypto.com Arena; 19,068 | 31-31 |
| 63 | February 27 | @ Houston | W 99–98 | Reggie Jackson (26) | Ivica Zubac (15) | Reggie Jackson (6) | Toyota Center; 14,324 | 32–31 |

March: 5–9 (home: 3–3; road: 2–6)

| Game | Date | Team | Score | High points | High rebounds | High assists | Location Attendance | Record |
|---|---|---|---|---|---|---|---|---|
| 64 | March 1 | @ Houston | W 113–100 | Ivica Zubac (22) | Ivica Zubac (12) | Reggie Jackson (6) | Toyota Center; 12,949 | 33–31 |
| 65 | March 3 | L.A. Lakers | W 132–111 | Reggie Jackson (36) | Ivica Zubac (9) | Reggie Jackson (9) | Crypto.com Arena; 19,068 | 34–31 |
| 66 | March 6 | New York | L 93–116 | Amir Coffey (16) | Ivica Zubac (9) | Hartenstein, Jackson, Mann (4) | Crypto.com Arena; 17,422 | 34–32 |
| 67 | March 8 | @ Golden State | L 97–112 | Nicolas Batum (17) | Ivica Zubac (9) | Reggie Jackson (7) | Chase Center; 18,064 | 34–33 |
| 68 | March 9 | Washington | W 115–109 | Reggie Jackson (31) | Zubac, Mann (9) | Reggie Jackson (7) | Crypto.com Arena; 15,282 | 35–33 |
| 69 | March 11 | @ Atlanta | L 106–112 | Jackson, Zubac (24) | Ivica Zubac (12) | Reggie Jackson (5) | State Farm Arena; 16,862 | 35–34 |
| 70 | March 13 | @ Detroit | W 106–102 | Marcus Morris (31) | Ivica Zubac (15) | Reggie Jackson (9) | Little Caesars Arena; 19,313 | 36–34 |
| 71 | March 14 | @ Cleveland | L 111–120 (OT) | Ivica Zubac (24) | Ivica Zubac (14) | Nicolas Batum (6) | Rocket Mortgage FieldHouse; 18,742 | 36–35 |
| 72 | March 16 | Toronto | L 100–103 | Reggie Jackson (23) | Terance Mann (9) | Reggie Jackson (9) | Crypto.com Arena; 19,068 | 36–36 |
| 73 | March 18 | @ Utah | L 92–121 | Robert Covington (18) | Isaiah Hartenstein (9) | Isaiah Hartenstein (8) | Vivint Arena; 18,306 | 36–37 |
| 74 | March 22 | @ Denver | L 115–127 | Terance Mann (24) | Terance Mann (8) | Reggie Jackson (6) | Ball Arena; 16,089 | 36–38 |
| 75 | March 25 | Philadelphia | L 97–122 | Amir Coffey (21) | Isaiah Hartenstein (9) | Ivica Zubac (6) | Crypto.com Arena; 19,068 | 36–39 |
| 76 | March 29 | Utah | W 121–115 | Paul George (34) | Isaiah Hartenstein (7) | George, Hartenstein (6) | Crypto.com Arena; 19,068 | 37–39 |
| 77 | March 31 | @ Chicago | L 130–135 (OT) | Reggie Jackson (34) | Ivica Zubac (9) | Reggie Jackson (7) | United Center; 21,519 | 37–40 |

April: 5–0 (home: 4–0; road: 1–0)

| Game | Date | Team | Score | High points | High rebounds | High assists | Location Attendance | Record |
|---|---|---|---|---|---|---|---|---|
| 78 | April 1 | @ Milwaukee | W 153–119 | Robert Covington (43) | Isaiah Hartenstein (10) | Amir Coffey (7) | Fiserv Forum; 18,023 | 38–40 |
| 79 | April 3 | New Orleans | W 119–100 | Marcus Morris (22) | Ivica Zubac (14) | Reggie Jackson (10) | Crypto.com Arena; 16,840 | 39–40 |
| 80 | April 6 | Phoenix | W 113–107 | Norman Powell (24) | Ivica Zubac (11) | Isaiah Hartenstein (5) | Crypto.com Arena; 19,068 | 40-40 |
| 81 | April 9 | Sacramento | W 117–98 | Paul George (23) | Ivica Zubac (12) | Paul George (12) | Crypto.com Arena; 17,568 | 41–40 |
| 82 | April 10 | Oklahoma City | W 138–88 | Amir Coffey (35) | Amir Coffey (13) | Xavier Moon (7) | Crypto.com Arena; 18,210 | 42–40 |

2021–22 season schedule

=== Play-in ===
2021 preseason game log
Total: 0–2 (Home: 0–1; Road: 0–1)
Play-in: 0–2 (home: 0–1; road: 0–1)

| Game | Date | Team | Score | High points | High rebounds | High assists | Location Attendance | Record |
|---|---|---|---|---|---|---|---|---|
| 1 | April 12 | @ Minnesota | L 104–109 | Paul George (34) | Ivica Zubac (9) | Jackson, George (5) | Target Center; 17,136 | 0–1 |
| 2 | April 15 | New Orleans | L 101–105 | Morris, Jackson (27) | Nicolas Batum (10) | Jackson (8) | Crypto.com Arena; 19,068 | 0–2 |

2021–22 season schedule

== Player statistics ==
Legend
| GP | Games played | GS | Games started | MPG | Minutes per game |
| FG% | Field-goal percentage | 3P% | 3-point field-goal percentage | FT% | Free-throw percentage |
| RPG | Rebounds per game | APG | Assists per game | SPG | Steals per game |
| BPG | Blocks per game | PPG | Points per game |

=== Regular season ===
| Player | GP | GS | MPG | FG% | 3P% | FT% | RPG | APG | SPG | BPG | PPG |
|---|---|---|---|---|---|---|---|---|---|---|---|
| Terance Mann | 81 | 33 | 28.6 | .484 | .365 | .780 | 5.2 | 2.6 | .7 | .3 | 10.8 |
| Ivica Zubac | 76 | 76 | 24.4 | .626 | | .727 | 8.5 | 1.6 | .5 | 1.0 | 10.3 |
| Reggie Jackson | 75 | 75 | 31.2 | .392 | .326 | .847 | 3.6 | 4.8 | .7 | .2 | 16.8 |
| Luke Kennard | 70 | 13 | 27.4 | .449 | .449 | .896 | 3.3 | 2.1 | .6 | .1 | 11.9 |
| Amir Coffey | 69 | 30 | 22.7 | .453 | .378 | .863 | 2.9 | 1.8 | .6 | .2 | 9.0 |
| Isaiah Hartenstein | 68 | 0 | 17.9 | .626 | .467 | .689 | 4.9 | 2.4 | .7 | 1.1 | 8.3 |
| Nicolas Batum | 59 | 54 | 24.8 | .463 | .400 | .658 | 4.3 | 1.7 | 1.0 | .7 | 8.3 |
| Marcus Morris Sr. | 54 | 54 | 29.0 | .434 | .367 | .872 | 4.4 | 2.1 | .5 | .3 | 15.4 |
| Eric Bledsoe | 54 | 29 | 25.2 | .421 | .313 | .761 | 3.4 | 4.2 | 1.3 | .4 | 9.9 |
| Brandon Boston Jr. | 51 | 0 | 14.9 | .385 | .306 | .819 | 2.2 | 1.0 | .5 | .3 | 6.7 |
| Justise Winslow^{†} | 37 | 1 | 13.0 | .447 | .172 | .610 | 3.6 | 1.4 | .6 | .5 | 4.2 |
| Serge Ibaka^{†} | 35 | 10 | 15.4 | .490 | .387 | .690 | 4.3 | 1.0 | .2 | .7 | 6.6 |
| Paul George | 31 | 31 | 34.7 | .421 | .354 | .858 | 6.9 | 5.7 | 2.2 | .4 | 24.3 |
| Robert Covington^{†} | 23 | 2 | 22.1 | .500 | .450 | .848 | 5.1 | 1.0 | 1.3 | 1.2 | 10.4 |
| Jay Scrubb | 18 | 0 | 6.7 | .391 | .286 | .700 | .9 | .4 | .2 | .2 | 2.7 |
| Keon Johnson^{†} | 15 | 0 | 9.0 | .333 | .273 | .762 | 1.4 | .9 | .5 | .1 | 3.5 |
| Rodney Hood^{†} | 13 | 0 | 9.8 | .462 | .545 | .800 | .8 | .6 | .2 | .2 | 2.6 |
| Xavier Moon | 10 | 0 | 13.7 | .490 | .357 | .600 | 1.4 | 2.4 | .7 | .3 | 5.8 |
| Semi Ojeleye^{†} | 10 | 0 | 9.8 | .414 | .444 | .813 | 1.6 | .4 | .2 | .1 | 4.1 |
| Wenyen Gabriel^{†} | 6 | 0 | 7.7 | .385 | .400 | .500 | 2.3 | .3 | .2 | .3 | 2.3 |
| Norman Powell^{†} | 5 | 2 | 25.0 | .508 | .542 | .857 | 2.8 | 2.8 | .4 | .8 | 21.4 |
| James Ennis III^{†} | 2 | 0 | 14.0 | .636 | .500 | 1.000 | 2.5 | .0 | .5 | .5 | 10.0 |
| Moses Wright^{†} | 1 | 0 | 1.0 | | | | .0 | 1.0 | .0 | .0 | .0 |

- ^{†} Denotes player spent time with another team in the season. Stats reflect time with the Clippers only.

== Transactions ==
=== Trades ===
July 29, 2021
To Los Angeles Clippers

Draft rights to Keon Johnson (No. 21)
To New York Knicks

Draft rights to Quentin Grimes (No. 25)
2024 DET second-round pick
July 29, 2021
To Los Angeles Clippers

Draft rights to Jason Preston (No. 33)
To Orlando Magic

2026 DET second-round pick
Cash considerations
August 7, 2021
To Los Angeles Clippers

Draft rights to Brandon Boston Jr. (No. 51)
To New Orleans Pelicans

2022 SAC protected second-round pick
Cash considerations
August 16, 2021
To Los Angeles Clippers

Eric Bledsoe
To Memphis Grizzlies

Patrick Beverley
Rajon Rondo
Daniel Oturu
February 4, 2022
To Los Angeles Clippers

Robert Covington
Norman Powell
To Portland Trail Blazers

Eric Bledsoe
Keon Johnson
Justise Winslow
2025 DET 2nd-round pick
February 10, 2022
To Los Angeles Clippers

Rodney Hood (from Milwaukee)
Semi Ojeleye (from Milwaukee)
Draft rights to Vanja Marinkovic (from Sacramento)

To Milwaukee Bucks

Serge Ibaka (from Los Angeles)
2023 2nd-round pick (from Detroit)
2024 POR 2nd-round pick (from Detroit)
Cash considerations

To Detroit Pistons

Marvin Bagley III (from Sacramento)

To Sacramento Kings

Donte DiVincenzo (from Milwaukee)
Josh Jackson (from Detroit)
Trey Lyles (from Detroit)
Draft rights to David Michineau (from Los Angeles)
2024 SAC 2nd-round pick (from Detroit)

=== Free agency ===
==== Re-signed ====
| Player | Signed |
|---|---|
| Reggie Jackson | August 11, 2021 |
| Kawhi Leonard | August 12, 2021 |
| Nicolas Batum | August 13, 2021 |
| Amir Coffey | September 27, 2021, Two-way contract |

==== Additions ====
| Player | Signed | Former team |
|---|---|---|
| Justise Winslow | August 8, 2021 | Memphis Grizzlies |
| Isaiah Hartenstein | September 27, 2021 | Cleveland Cavaliers |
| Moses Wright | December 21, 2021, 10-day contract | Agua Caliente Clippers |
| Xavier Moon | December 26, 2021, 1st 10-day contract January 4, 2022, 2nd 10-day contract January 14, 2022, 3rd 10-day contract March 26, 2022, Two-way contract | Agua Caliente Clippers |
| James Ennis III | December 29, 2021, 10-day contract | Brooklyn Nets |
| Wenyen Gabriel | December 31, 2021, 1st 10-day contract January 11, 2022, 2nd 10-day contract | Brooklyn Nets |

==== Subtractions ====
| Player | Reason left | New team |
|---|---|---|
| Patrick Patterson | Free agency | Portland Trail Blazers |
| Yogi Ferrell | Waived | (Greece) Panathinaikos |
| DeMarcus Cousins | Free agency | Milwaukee Bucks |
| Moses Wright | Contract expired, December 31, 2021 | Agua Caliente Clippers |
| James Ennis III | Contract expired, January 8, 2022 | Denver Nuggets |
| Wenyen Gabriel | Contract expired, January 21, 2022 | Wisconsin Herd |
| Xavier Moon | Contract expired, January 24, 2022 | Agua Caliente Clippers |
| Semi Ojeleye | Waived, March 26, 2022 | (Italy) Virtus Bologna |
