= Keon Johnson (basketball, born 2002) =

American basketball player (born 2002)

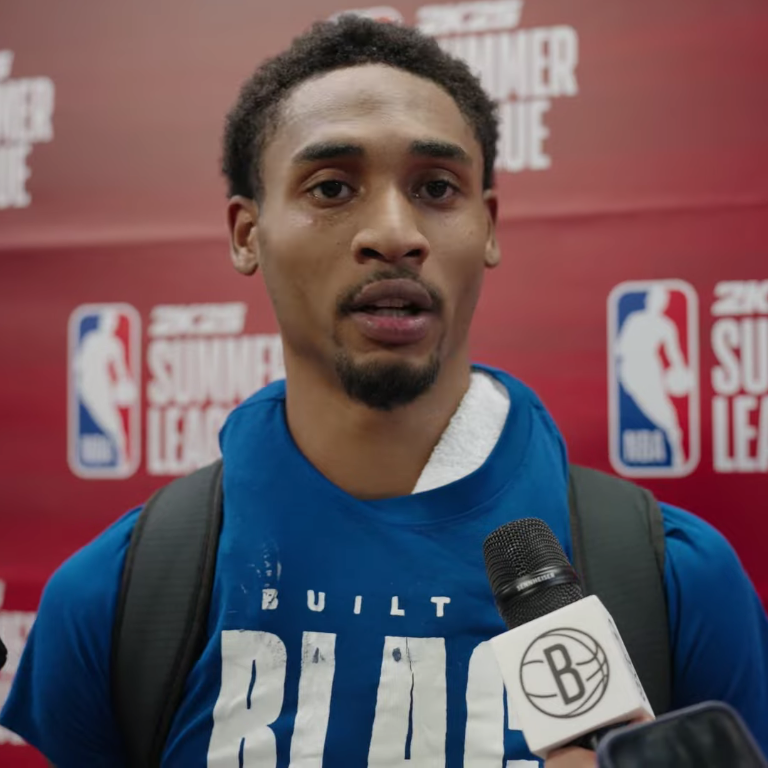
- Johnson during the 2024 NBA Summer League

No. 45 – College Park Skyhawks
- Position: Shooting guard
- League: NBA G League

Personal information
- Born: March 10, 2002 (age 24) Shelbyville, Tennessee, U.S.
- Listed height: 6 ft 5 in (1.96 m)
- Listed weight: 185 lb (84 kg)

Career information
- High school: The Webb School (Bell Buckle, Tennessee)
- College: Tennessee (2020–2021)
- NBA draft: 2021: 1st round, 21st overall pick
- Drafted by: New York Knicks
- Playing career: 2021–present

Career history
- 2021–2022: Los Angeles Clippers
- 2021–2022: →Agua Caliente Clippers
- 2022–2023: Portland Trail Blazers
- 2023–2025: Brooklyn Nets
- 2023–2024: →Long Island Nets
- 2025–2026: Maine Celtics
- 2026–present: College Park Skyhawks

Career highlights
- SEC All-Freshman Team (2021); 2× Tennessee Mr. Basketball (2018, 2019)
- Stats at NBA.com
- Stats at Basketball Reference

Christopher Keon Johnson (born March 10, 2002) is an American professional basketball player for the College Park Skyhawks of the NBA G League. He played college basketball for the Tennessee Volunteers. Johnson was selected in the 2021 NBA draft with the 21st overall pick by the New York Knicks, but was traded to the Los Angeles Clippers on draft night. During his rookie season, the Clippers traded him to the Portland Trail Blazers with whom he played for until the end of the 2022–23 season. After getting traded to and waived by the Phoenix Suns during the 2023 offseason, Johnson signed with the Brooklyn Nets.

== Early life ==
Two months before beginning high school, Johnson suffered open fractures in four of his fingers, was thrown about 10 feet and lost consciousness in a fireworks accident. He underwent surgery to repair blood vessels in his hand and avoid amputation, and he underwent eight weeks of intensive physical therapy.

Johnson played high school basketball for The Webb School in Bell Buckle, Tennessee. In his sophomore season, he averaged 25.6 points, 10.2 rebounds, and 4.1 assists per game, earning Division II-A Tennessee Mr. Basketball honors. As a junior, Johnson averaged 25.3 points, 9.4 rebounds and 3.7 assists per game, leading his team to the Division II-A state semifinals. He repeated as Division II-A Tennessee Mr. Basketball. Early in his senior season, Johnson suffered a season-ending meniscus injury. In four games, he averaged 30.5 points with 10.5 rebounds and 5.8 assists per game.

On August 6, 2019, Johnson committed to play college basketball for Tennessee over offers from Ohio State and Virginia, among others. By the end of his high school career, Johnson was rated by major recruiting services as a consensus five-star recruit and the highest ranked player in Tennessee in the 2020 class. He became the first top-ranked in-state prospect to commit to Tennessee since Robert Hubbs III in 2013.

College recruiting
Name	Hometown	School	Height	Weight	Commit date
Keon Johnson; SG	Shelbyville, TN	The Webb School (TN)	6 ft 5 in (1.96 m)	180 lb (82 kg)	Aug 9, 2019
Keon Johnson; SG	Recruit ratings: Rivals: 247Sports: ESPN: (90)				
Overall recruit ranking: Rivals: 18 247Sports: 17 ESPN: 28
Note: In many cases, Scout, Rivals, 247Sports, On3, and ESPN may conflict in their listings of height and weight.; In these cases, the average was taken. ESPN grades are on a 100-point scale.; Sources: "Tennessee 2020 Basketball Commitments". Rivals.; "2020 Tennessee Volunteers Recruiting Class". ESPN.; "2020 Team Ranking". Rivals.

== College career ==
On February 6, 2021, Johnson scored a career-high 27 points in an 82–71 win over Kentucky. As a freshman, he averaged 11.3 points, 3.5 rebounds and 2.5 assists per game, and was named to the Southeastern Conference (SEC) All-Freshman Team. On April 7, 2021, Johnson declared for the 2021 NBA draft, forgoing his college eligibility. At the NBA Draft Combine, he recorded the highest maximum vertical leap in combine history, at 48 inches.

== Professional career ==
=== Los Angeles Clippers (2021–2022) ===
Johnson was selected with the 21st pick in the 2021 NBA draft by the New York Knicks and was traded to the Los Angeles Clippers for Quentin Grimes and draft considerations. On August 6, 2021, he signed his rookie scale contract with the Clippers. Johnson played in only 15 games for the Clippers before the trade to Portland.

=== Portland Trail Blazers (2022–2023) ===
On February 4, 2022, Johnson was traded, alongside Eric Bledsoe, Justise Winslow, and a 2025 second-round pick, to the Portland Trail Blazers in exchange for Norman Powell and Robert Covington. Johnson made his Trail Blazers debut on February 24, recording four points and four rebounds in a 132–95 loss to the Golden State Warriors. On April 1, he scored a career-high 20 points, alongside three assists, in a 130–111 loss to the San Antonio Spurs. The Trail Blazers ultimately finished the season with a 27–55 record and did not qualify for the playoffs for the first time since 2013.

Johnson played for the Trail Blazers during the 2022 NBA Summer League. He averaged 14.2 points per game en route to the team's second Las Vegas Summer League championship in franchise history. On March 27, 2023, he tied his career high of 20 points, alongside three rebounds and six assists, in a 124–90 loss to the New Orleans Pelicans. Two days later, Trail Blazers head coach Chauncey Billups announced that Johnson had suffered a broken finger during a practice and would be out indefinitely.

On September 27, 2023, Johnson, alongside Grayson Allen, Jusuf Nurkić, and Nassir Little was traded to the Phoenix Suns as part of a three-team trade that sent Damian Lillard to the Milwaukee Bucks and Jrue Holiday, Toumani Camara, Deandre Ayton, and a 2029 first-round draft pick to the Portland Trail Blazers. The Suns later waived him on October 23 ahead of the 2023–24 regular season roster cut deadline.

=== Brooklyn Nets (2023–2025) ===
On November 1, 2023, Johnson signed a two-way contract with the Brooklyn Nets.

On July 21, 2024, Johnson re-signed with the Nets on a multi-year deal.

On September 17, 2025, the Nets waived Johnson, making him a free agent.

=== Maine Celtics (2025–2026) ===
On December 1, 2025, Johnson signed with the Maine Celtics of the NBA G League.

=== College Park Skyhawks (2026–present) ===
On September 23, 2026, Johnson signed an Exhibit 10 contract with the Atlanta Hawks.

== Career statistics ==
Legend
GP	Games played	GS	Games started	MPG	Minutes per game
FG%	Field goal percentage	3P%	3-point field goal percentage	FT%	Free throw percentage
RPG	Rebounds per game	APG	Assists per game	SPG	Steals per game
BPG	Blocks per game	PPG	Points per game	**Bold**	Career high

=== NBA ===
Year	Team	GP	GS	MPG	FG%	3P%	FT%	RPG	APG	SPG	BPG	PPG
2021–22	L.A. Clippers	15	0	9.0	.333	.273	.762	1.4	.9	.5	.1	3.5
2021–22	Portland	22	12	**25.5**	.357	.348	.833	2.7	**2.9**	**1.0**	**.5**	9.7
2022–23	Portland	40	0	10.4	.376	.346	.659	1.1	1.5	.5	.2	4.7
2023–24	Brooklyn	5	0	12.3	.381	**.400**	**.917**	1.4	.6	.6	.2	6.2
2024–25	Brooklyn	**79**	**56**	24.4	**.389**	.314	.770	**3.8**	2.2	**1.0**	.4	**10.6**
Career		161	68	19.2	.379	.324	.765	2.7	1.9	.8	.3	8.2

=== College ===
Year	Team	GP	GS	MPG	FG%	3P%	FT%	RPG	APG	SPG	BPG	PPG
2020–21	Tennessee	27	17	25.5	.449	.271	.703	3.5	2.5	1.1	.4	11.3

== Personal life ==
Johnson's mother, Conswella Sparrow Johnson, was a two-time Class AAA Tennessee Miss Basketball winner in high school and played college basketball for Auburn, where she was a two-time All-Southeastern Conference selection. He has worn the number 45 on the court just like his mom did.
