= 2021–22 San Antonio Spurs season =

- Head coach: Gregg Popovich
- President: Gregg Popovich; Brent Barry (vice)
- General manager: Brian Wright
- Owners: Peter Holt
- Arena: AT&T Center

Results
- Record: 34–48 (.415)
- Place: Division: 4th (Southwest); Conference: 10th (Western)
- Playoff finish: Did not qualify
- Stats at Basketball Reference

Local media
- Television: Bally Sports Southwest, KENS, KMYS
- Radio: 1200 WOAI

The 2021–22 San Antonio Spurs season was the 55th season of the franchise, its 46th in the National Basketball Association (NBA), and its 49th in the San Antonio area. For the first time since 2010–11, long-time point guard Patty Mills was not on the roster, as he signed with the Brooklyn Nets on August 10, 2021. Mills was previously the longest tenured player on the Spurs roster, and the last player from the 2013–14 championship season to remain on the roster. Mills' departure made sixth-year point guard Dejounte Murray the new longest tenured player on the roster.

On April 5, 2022, the Spurs became the 20th and final team to clinch a postseason position, clinching a spot in the elimination round in the play-in tournament for the second consecutive year, qualifying for the second consecutive year in the first stage as the No. 10 seed. However, they lost to the New Orleans Pelicans in the Play-In tournament, eliminating the Spurs from playoff contention for the third consecutive season.

== Draft ==
Round	Pick	Player	Position	Nationality	School/club team
1	12	Joshua Primo	SG	Canada	Alabama
2	41	Joe Wieskamp	SF	United States	Iowa

The Spurs entered the draft with one first-round pick and one second-round pick.

== Roster ==
2021–22 San Antonio Spurs roster
Players

Pos.	No.	Player	Height	Weight	DOB	From
F	31	Keita Bates-Diop	6 ft 8 in (2.03 m)	229 lb (104 kg)	1996-01-23	Ohio State
F/C	18	Devontae Cacok	6 ft 7 in (2.01 m)	240 lb (109 kg)	1996-10-08	UNC Wilmington
F/C	23	Zach Collins	6 ft 11 in (2.11 m)	250 lb (113 kg)	1997-11-19	Gonzaga
C	14	Drew Eubanks	6 ft 10 in (2.08 m)	245 lb (111 kg)	1997-02-01	Oregon State
G/F	3	Keldon Johnson	6 ft 5 in (1.96 m)	220 lb (100 kg)	1999-10-11	Kentucky
G	33	Tre Jones	6 ft 1 in (1.85 m)	185 lb (84 kg)	2000-01-08	Duke
F/C	34	Jock Landale	6 ft 11 in (2.11 m)	255 lb (116 kg)	1995-10-25	Saint Mary's
G/F	35	Romeo Langford	6 ft 4 in (1.93 m)	216 lb (98 kg)	1999-10-25	Indiana
F	17	Doug McDermott	6 ft 7 in (2.01 m)	225 lb (102 kg)	1992-01-03	Creighton
G	5	Dejounte Murray	6 ft 4 in (1.93 m)	180 lb (82 kg)	1996-09-19	Washington
C	25	Jakob Pöltl	7 ft 1 in (2.16 m)	245 lb (111 kg)	1995-10-15	Utah
G	11	Joshua Primo	6 ft 4 in (1.93 m)	189 lb (86 kg)	2002-12-24	Alabama
G/F	7	Josh Richardson	6 ft 5 in (1.96 m)	200 lb (91 kg)	1993-09-15	Tennessee
G	16	D. J. Stewart (TW)	6 ft 5 in (1.96 m)	205 lb (93 kg)	1999-06-28	Mississippi State
G/F	24	Devin Vassell	6 ft 5 in (1.96 m)	200 lb (91 kg)	2000-08-23	Florida State
G/F	1	Lonnie Walker	6 ft 4 in (1.93 m)	204 lb (93 kg)	1998-12-14	Miami (FL)
G/F	15	Joe Wieskamp	6 ft 6 in (1.98 m)	205 lb (93 kg)	1999-08-23	Iowa
F	28	Robert Woodard (TW)	6 ft 6 in (1.98 m)	235 lb (107 kg)	1999-09-22	Mississippi State

Coaches
Head coach
- Gregg Popovich
Assistant(s)
- Chip Engelland
- Mitch Johnson
- Matthew Nielsen
- Darius Songaila

Legend
- (DP) Unsigned draft pick
- (FA) Free agent
- (S) Suspended
- (GL) On assignment to G League affiliate
- (TW) Two-way affiliate player
- Injured

Roster
Updated: December 5, 2024

== Standings ==
=== Division ===
Southwest Division	W	L	PCT	GB	Home	Road	Div	GP
y – Memphis Grizzlies	56	26	.683	–	30‍–‍11	26‍–‍15	11–5	82
x – Dallas Mavericks	52	30	.634	4.0	29‍–‍12	23‍–‍18	14–2	82
x – New Orleans Pelicans	36	46	.439	20.0	19‍–‍22	17‍–‍24	6–10	82
pi − San Antonio Spurs	34	48	.415	22.0	16‍–‍25	18‍–‍23	6–10	82
Houston Rockets	20	62	.244	36.0	11‍–‍30	9‍–‍32	3–13	82

=== Conference ===
Western Conference
#	Team	W	L	PCT	GB	GP
1	z – Phoenix Suns *	64	18	.780	–	82
2	y – Memphis Grizzlies *	56	26	.683	8.0	82
3	x – Golden State Warriors	53	29	.646	11.0	82
4	x – Dallas Mavericks	52	30	.634	12.0	82
5	y – Utah Jazz *	49	33	.598	15.0	82
6	x – Denver Nuggets	48	34	.585	16.0	82
7	x – Minnesota Timberwolves	46	36	.561	18.0	82
8	pi – Los Angeles Clippers	42	40	.512	22.0	82
9	x – New Orleans Pelicans	36	46	.439	28.0	82
10	pi − San Antonio Spurs	34	48	.415	30.0	82
11	Los Angeles Lakers	33	49	.402	31.0	82
12	Sacramento Kings	30	52	.366	34.0	82
13	Portland Trail Blazers	27	55	.329	37.0	82
14	Oklahoma City Thunder	24	58	.293	40.0	82
15	Houston Rockets	20	62	.244	44.0	82

== Schedule ==
=== Preseason ===
2021 preseason game log
Total: 3–2 (Home: 2–1; Road: 1–1)
Preseason: 3–2 (home: 2–1; road: 1–1)

Game	Date	Team	Score	High points	High rebounds	High assists	Location Attendance	Record
1	October 4	Utah	W 111–85	Murray, Primo (17)	Jakob Pöltl (10)	Drew Eubanks (4)	AT&T Center; 10,174	1–0
2	October 6	@ Detroit	L 105–115	Bryn Forbes (20)	Derrick White (7)	Derrick White (9)	Little Caesars Arena; 5,423	1–1
3	October 8	Miami	L 105–109	Keldon Johnson (23)	Drew Eubanks (8)	Dejounte Murray (6)	AT&T Center; 15,160	1–2
4	October 10	@ Orlando	W 101–100	Dejounte Murray (18)	Jakob Pöltl (9)	Lonnie Walker (5)	Amway Center; 12,509	2–2
5	October 15	Houston	W 126–98	Murray, White (20)	Drew Eubanks (9)	Dejounte Murray (7)	AT&T Center; 17,676	3–2

2021–22 season schedule

=== Regular season ===
2021–22 game log
Total: 34–48 (Home: 16–25; Road: 18–23)
October: 2–4 (home: 1–2; road: 1–2)

Game	Date	Team	Score	High points	High rebounds	High assists	Location Attendance	Record
1	October 20	Orlando	W 123–97	Devin Vassell (19)	Jakob Pöltl (13)	Dejounte Murray (9)	AT&T Center; 16,697	1–0
2	October 22	@ Denver	L 96–102	Keldon Johnson (27)	Dejounte Murray (9)	Derrick White (8)	Ball Arena; 19,520	1–1
3	October 23	Milwaukee	L 111–121	Doug McDermott (25)	Dejounte Murray (9)	Derrick White (8)	AT&T Center; 14,353	1–2
4	October 26	L.A. Lakers	L 121–125 (OT)	Jakob Pöltl (27)	Jakob Pöltl (14)	Dejounte Murray (15)	AT&T Center; 18,354	1–3
5	October 28	@ Dallas	L 99–104	Dejounte Murray (23)	Jakob Pöltl (13)	Dejounte Murray (8)	American Airlines Center; 19,228	1–4
6	October 30	@ Milwaukee	W 102–93	Dejounte Murrary (23)	Keldon Johnson (11)	Dejounte Murray (9)	Fiserv Forum; 17,341	2–4

November: 4–9 (home: 3–3; road: 1–6)

Game	Date	Team	Score	High points	High rebounds	High assists	Location Attendance	Record
7	November 1	@ Indiana	L 118–131	Dejounte Murray (16)	Jakob Pöltl (6)	Derrick White (7)	Gainbridge Fieldhouse; 10,227	2–5
8	November 3	Dallas	L 108–109	Dejounte Murray (23)	Dejounte Murray (9)	Dejounte Murray (8)	AT&T Center; 16,356	2–6
9	November 5	@ Orlando	W 102–89	Dejounte Murrary (20)	Dejounte Murray (11)	Dejounte Murray (7)	Amway Center; 14,101	3–6
10	November 7	@ Oklahoma City	L 94–99	Keldon Johnson (22)	Drew Eubanks (11)	Dejounte Murray (9)	Paycom Center; 12,972	3–7
11	November 10	Sacramento	W 136–117	Dejounte Murray (26)	Keldon Johnson (12)	Thaddeus Young (8)	AT&T Center; 15,065	4–7
12	November 12	Dallas	L 109–123	Devin Vassell (20)	Keldon Johnson (9)	White, Young (5)	AT&T Center; 13,425	4–8
13	November 14	@ L.A. Lakers	L 106–114	Keldon Johnson (24)	Dejounte Murray (10)	Dejounte Murray (10)	Staples Center; 18,997	4–9
14	November 16	@ L.A. Clippers	L 92–106	Dejounte Murray (26)	Dejounte Murray (12)	Dejounte Murray (9)	Staples Center; 13,298	4–10
15	November 18	@ Minnesota	L 90–115	Devin Vassell (18)	Dejounte Murray (8)	Murray, White (4)	Target Center; 13,572	4–11
16	November 22	Phoenix	L 111–115	Derrick White (19)	Dejounte Murray (10)	Dejounte Murray (11)	AT&T Center; 14,715	4–12
17	November 24	Atlanta	L 106–124	Bryn Forbes (23)	Jakob Pöltl (10)	Dejounte Murray (11)	AT&T Center; 13,161	4–13
18	November 26	Boston	W 96–88	Dejounte Murray (29)	Keldon Johnson (14)	Derrick White (19)	AT&T Center; 15,360	5–13
19	November 29	Washington	W 116–99	Derrick White (24)	Jakob Pöltl (11)	Dejounte Murray (8)	AT&T Center; 12,606	6–13

December: 8–7 (home: 3–4; road: 5–3)

Game	Date	Team	Score	High points	High rebounds	High assists	Location Attendance	Record
20	December 2	@ Portland	W 114–83	Bryn Forbes (18)	Jakob Pöltl (9)	Dejounte Murray (13)	Moda Center; 16,143	7–13
21	December 4	@ Golden State	W 112–107	Derrick White (25)	Dejounte Murray (12)	Dejounte Murray (7)	Chase Center; 18,064	8–13
22	December 6	@ Phoenix	L 104–108	Dejounte Murray (17)	Jakob Pöltl (11)	Dejounte Murray (14)	Footprint Center; 15,292	8–14
23	December 7	New York	L 109–121	Derrick White (26)	Jakob Pöltl (8)	Murray, White (7)	AT&T Center; 14,698	8–15
24	December 9	Denver	W 123–111	Derrick White (23)	Bates-Diop, Pöltl (9)	Dejounte Murray (9)	AT&T Center; 12,855	9–15
25	December 11	Denver	L 112–127	Lonnie Walker IV (16)	Tre Jones (9)	Tre Jones (5)	AT&T Center; 14,607	9–16
26	December 12	New Orleans	W 112–97	Pöltl, White (24)	Murray, Pöltl (12)	Dejounte Murray (10)	AT&T Center; 14,990	10–16
27	December 15	Charlotte	L 115–131	Bryn Forbes (25)	Murray, White (6)	Dejounte Murray (9)	AT&T Center; 14,354	10–17
28	December 17	@ Utah	W 128–126	Keldon Johnson (24)	Dejounte Murray (11)	Dejounte Murray (11)	Vivint Arena; 18,306	11–17
29	December 19	@ Sacramento	L 114–121	Dejounte Murray (25)	Keldon Johnson (11)	Dejounte Murray (9)	Golden 1 Center; 15,091	11–18
30	December 20	@ L.A. Clippers	W 116–92	Dejounte Murray (24)	Dejounte Murray (12)	Dejounte Murray (13)	Staples Center; 18,096	12–18
31	December 23	@ L.A. Lakers	W 138–110	Keita Bates-Diop (30)	Keldon Johnson (10)	Dejounte Murray (13)	Staples Center; 18,997	13–18
32	December 26	Detroit	W 144–109	Keldon Johnson (27)	Drew Eubanks (7)	Tre Jones (11)	AT&T Center; 14,715	14–18
33	December 27	Utah	L 104–110	Derrick White (21)	Jakob Pöltl (13)	Derrick White (8)	AT&T Center; 16,255	14–19
—	December 29	Miami	Postponed due to COVID-19 pandemic					
34	December 31	@ Memphis	L 105–118	Forbes, Pöltl & White (15)	Keita Bates-Diop (11)	Derrick White (9)	FedExForum; 15,412	14–20

January: 5–12 (home: 3–6; road: 2–6)

Game	Date	Team	Score	High points	High rebounds	High assists	Location Attendance	Record
35	January 1	@ Detroit	L 116–117 (OT)	Bryn Forbes (27)	Jakob Pöltl (12)	Derrick White (14)	Little Caesars Arena; 18,911	14–21
36	January 4	@ Toronto	L 104–129	Jakob Pöltl (19)	Jakob Pöltl (12)	Johnson, Jones, Pöltl, Primo (4)	Scotiabank Arena; 0	14–22
37	January 5	@ Boston	W 99–97	Dejounte Murray (22)	Jakob Pöltl (14)	Dejounte Murray (12)	TD Garden; 19,156	15–22
38	January 7	@ Philadelphia	L 100–119	Dejounte Murray (27)	Jakob Pöltl (6)	Dejounte Murray (9)	Wells Fargo Center; 20,265	15–23
39	January 9	@ Brooklyn	L 119–121 (OT)	Lonnie Walker IV (25)	Jakob Pöltl (12)	Dejounte Murray (12)	Barclays Center; 15,606	15–24
40	January 10	@ New York	L 96–111	Dejounte Murray (24)	Cacok, Pöltl (10)	Dejounte Murray (5)	Madison Square Garden; 16,569	15–25
41	January 12	Houston	L 124–128	Dejounte Murray (32)	Dejounte Murray (10)	Dejounte Murray (11)	AT&T Center; 11,314	15–26
42	January 14	Cleveland	L 109–114	Dejounte Murray (30)	Dejounte Murray (14)	Dejounte Murray (8)	AT&T Center; 12,160	15–27
43	January 15	L.A. Clippers	W 101–94	Derrick White (19)	Landale, Vassell (11)	Dejounte Murray (9)	AT&T Center; 13,223	16–27
44	January 17	Phoenix	L 107–121	Jakob Pöltl (23)	Jakob Pöltl (14)	Derrick White (7)	AT&T Center; 10,422	16–28
45	January 19	Oklahoma City	W 118–96	Dejounte Murray (23)	Dejounte Murray (10)	Dejounte Murray (14)	AT&T Center; 11,848	17–28
46	January 21	Brooklyn	L 102–117	Dejounte Murray (25)	Dejounte Murray (12)	Dejounte Murray (10)	AT&T Center; 15,068	17–29
47	January 23	Philadelphia	L 109–115	Jakob Pöltl (25)	Jakob Pöltl (10)	Dejounte Murray (12)	AT&T Center; 16,437	17–30
48	January 25	@ Houston	W 134–104	Dejounte Murray (19)	Eubanks, Pöltl (9)	Dejounte Murray (10)	Toyota Center; 15,007	18–30
49	January 26	Memphis	L 110–118	Devin Vassell (20)	Dejounte Murray (10)	Dejounte Murray (11)	AT&T Center; 14,662	18–31
50	January 28	Chicago	W 131–122	Dejounte Murray (29)	Jakob Pöltl (11)	Dejounte Murray (12)	AT&T Center; 18,354	19–31
51	January 30	@ Phoenix	L 110–115	Doug McDermott (24)	Keldon Johnson (8)	Tre Jones (9)	Footprint Center; 17,071	19–32

February: 5–6 (home: 1–2; road: 4–4)

Game	Date	Team	Score	High points	High rebounds	High assists	Location Attendance	Record
52	February 1	Golden State	L 120–124	Dejounte Murray (27)	Dejounte Murray (9)	Dejounte Murray (9)	AT&T Center; 17,070	19–33
53	February 3	Miami	L 95–112	Derrick White (22)	Thaddeus Young (8)	Jones, Johnson, Vassell, Young (3)	AT&T Center; 14,971	19–34
54	February 4	Houston	W 131–106	Keldon Johnson (28)	Jakob Pöltl (10)	Dejounte Murray (11)	AT&T Center; 15,344	20–34
55	February 9	@ Cleveland	L 92–105	Vassell, Johnson (18)	Jakob Pöltl (11)	Dejounte Murray (9)	Rocket Mortgage FieldHouse; 19,432	20–35
56	February 11	@ Atlanta	W 136–121	Dejounte Murray (32)	Dejounte Murray (10)	Dejounte Murray (15)	State Farm Arena; 17,234	21–35
57	February 12	@ New Orleans	W 124–114	Dejounte Murray (31)	Jakob Pöltl (11)	Dejounte Murray (12)	Smoothie King Center; 16,615	22–35
58	February 14	@ Chicago	L 109–120	Lonnie Walker IV (21)	Jakob Pöltl (9)	Dejounte Murray (11)	United Center; 21,153	22–36
59	February 16	@ Oklahoma City	W 114–106	Keldon Johnson (22)	Jakob Pöltl (17)	Dejounte Murray (8)	Paycom Center; 14,920	23–36
60	February 25	@ Washington	W 157–153 (2OT)	Keldon Johnson (32)	Dejounte Murray (13)	Dejounte Murray (14)	Capital One Arena; 15,302	24–36
61	February 26	@ Miami	L 129–133	Bates-Diop, Vassell, Walker (22)	Keita Bates-Diop (11)	Tre Jones (11)	FTX Arena; 19,677	24–37
62	February 28	@ Memphis	L 105–118	Lonnie Walker IV (22)	Jakob Pöltl (10)	Dejounte Murray (8)	FedExForum; 16,812	24–38

March: 7–7 (home: 3–6; road: 4–1)

Game	Date	Team	Score	High points	High rebounds	High assists	Location Attendance	Record
63	March 3	Sacramento	L 112–115	Lonnie Walker IV (30)	Dejounte Murray (12)	Dejounte Murray (7)	AT&T Center; 13,049	24–39
64	March 5	@ Charlotte	L 117–123	Keldon Johnson (33)	Zach Collins (10)	Dejounte Murray (10)	Spectrum Center; 18,941	24–40
65	March 7	L.A. Lakers	W 117–110	Dejounte Murray (26)	Dejounte Murray (10)	Dejounte Murray (8)	AT&T Center; 18,354	25–40
66	March 9	Toronto	L 104–119	Keldon Johnson (27)	Jakob Pöltl (12)	Dejounte Murray (12)	AT&T Center; 15,121	25–41
67	March 11	Utah	W 104–102	Dejounte Murray (27)	Jakob Pöltl (11)	Dejounte Murray (4)	AT&T Center; 15,753	26–41
68	March 12	Indiana	L 108–119	Jock Landale (26)	Tre Jones (10)	Tre Jones (12)	AT&T Center; 14,605	26–42
69	March 14	Minnesota	L 139–149	Keldon Johnson (34)	Keldon Johnson (8)	Dejounte Murray (12)	AT&T Center; 14,143	26–43
70	March 16	Oklahoma City	W 122–120	Dejounte Murray (26)	Jakob Pöltl (14)	Dejounte Murray (12)	AT&T Center; 14,994	27–43
71	March 18	New Orleans	L 91–124	Devin Vassell (18)	Dejounte Murray (9)	Dejounte Murray (5)	AT&T Center; 18,354	27–44
72	March 20	@ Golden State	W 110–108	Josh Richardson (25)	Jakob Pöltl (14)	Dejounte Murray (8)	Chase Center; 18,064	28–44
73	March 23	@ Portland	W 133–96	Dejounte Murray (28)	Collins, Pöltl (9)	Tre Jones (9)	Moda Center; 16,610	29–44
74	March 26	@ New Orleans	W 107–103	Keldon Johnson (21)	Murray, Pöltl (11)	Dejounte Murray (13)	Smoothie King Center; 13,097	30–44
75	March 28	@ Houston	W 123–120	Dejounte Murray (33)	Jakob Pöltl (13)	Dejounte Murray (11)	Toyota Center; 18,055	31–44
76	March 30	Memphis	L 111–112	Dejounte Murray (33)	Dejounte Murray (13)	Pöltl, Richardson (5)	AT&T Center; 15,821	31–45

April: 3–3 (home: 2–1; road: 1–2)

Game	Date	Team	Score	High points	High rebounds	High assists	Location Attendance	Record
77	April 1	Portland	W 130–111	Devin Vassell (22)	Zach Collins (9)	Tre Jones (9)	AT&T Center; 17,512	32–45
78	April 3	Portland	W 113–92	Keldon Johnson (28)	Zach Collins (13)	Tre Jones (7)	AT&T Center; 15,816	33–45
79	April 5	@ Denver	W 116–97	Johnson, Vassell (20)	Johnson, Pöltl, Vassell (8)	Tre Jones (10)	Ball Arena; 17,037	34–45
80	April 7	@ Minnesota	L 121–127	Keldon Johnson (20)	Jakob Pöltl (17)	Tre Jones (8)	Target Center; 17,136	34–46
81	April 9	Golden State	L 94–100	Lonnie Walker (24)	Collins, Landale (11)	Tre Jones (7)	AT&T Center; 18,627	34–47
82	April 10	@ Dallas	L 120–130	Keldon Johnson (24)	Jakob Pöltl (10)	Dejounte Murray (7)	American Airlines Center; 20,270	34-48

2021–22 season schedule

=== Play-in ===
2022 play-in game log
Total: 0–1 (Home: 0–0; Road: 0–1)
Play-in: 0–1 (home: 0–0; road: 0–1)

Game	Date	Team	Score	High points	High rebounds	High assists	Location Attendance	Record
1	April 13	@ New Orleans	L 103–113	Devin Vassell (23)	Pöltl, Murray (9)	Dejounte Murray (5)	Smoothie King Center; 18,610	0–1

2021–22 season schedule

== Player statistics ==
Legend
GP	Games played	GS	Games started	MPG	Minutes per game
FG%	Field-goal percentage	3P%	3-point field-goal percentage	FT%	Free-throw percentage
RPG	Rebounds per game	APG	Assists per game	SPG	Steals per game
BPG	Blocks per game	PPG	Points per game

=== Regular season ===
San Antonio Spurs statistics
Player	GP	GS	MPG	FG%	3P%	FT%	RPG	APG	SPG	BPG	PPG
Keldon Johnson	75	74	31.9	.466	.398	.756	6.1	2.1	.8	.2	17.0
Devin Vassell	71	32	27.3	.427	.361	.838	4.3	1.9	1.1	.6	12.3
Lonnie Walker IV	70	6	23.0	.407	.314	.784	2.6	2.2	.6	.3	12.1
Tre Jones	69	11	16.6	.490	.196	.780	2.2	3.4	.6	.1	6.0
Dejounte Murray	68	68	34.8	.462	.327	.794	8.3	9.2	2.0	.3	21.1
Jakob Pöltl	68	67	29.0	.618	1.000	.495	9.3	2.8	.7	1.7	13.5
Keita Bates-Diop	59	14	16.2	.517	.309	.754	3.9	.7	.5	.2	5.7
Jock Landale	54	1	10.9	.495	.326	.829	2.6	.8	.2	.3	4.9
Doug McDermott	51	51	24.0	.462	.422	.784	2.3	1.3	.3	.1	11.3
Joshua Primo	50	16	19.3	.374	.307	.746	2.3	1.6	.4	.5	5.8
Derrick White^{†}	49	48	30.3	.426	.314	.869	3.5	5.6	1.0	.9	14.4
Drew Eubanks^{†}	49	9	12.1	.528	.125	.747	4.0	1.0	.3	.6	4.7
Bryn Forbes^{†}	40	1	16.9	.432	.417	.898	1.6	1.0	.4	.1	9.1
Joe Wieskamp	29	0	7.1	.357	.326	.538	.5	.3	.1	.1	2.1
Zach Collins	28	4	17.9	.490	.341	.800	5.5	2.2	.5	.8	7.8
Thaddeus Young^{†}	26	1	14.2	.578	.000	.455	3.6	2.3	.9	.3	6.1
Josh Richardson^{†}	21	7	24.4	.429	.444	.946	2.9	2.3	1.0	.3	11.4
Devontae Cacok	15	0	8.1	.677		.571	2.8	.4	.5	.5	3.1
Juancho Hernangómez^{†}	5	0	10.2	.333	.000	.750	3.0	.6	.2	.2	1.4
Romeo Langford^{†}	4	0	10.8	.571	.000	.375	1.0	.5	.3	.0	2.8
Tyler Johnson^{†}	3	0	17.7	.200	.333		2.0	1.7	.7	.7	2.0
Jaylen Morris	3	0	5.3	.000	.000	.500	.7	.7	.0	.0	.7
Anthony Lamb	2	0	4.0	.000	.000		.5	1.0	.0	.0	.0
Tomáš Satoranský^{†}	1	0	9.0			.750	1.0	.0	.0	.0	3.0

- ^{†} Denotes player spent time with another team in the season. Stats reflect time with the Spurs only.

== Transactions ==
=== Trades ===
Five-team trade

August 6, 2021
To Brooklyn Nets

- 2024 second-round pick (from Washington)
- 2025 second-round pick swap rights (from Washington)
- Draft rights to Nikola Milutinov (2015 No. 26) (from San Antonio)
To Indiana Pacers

- Draft rights to Isaiah Jackson (No. 22) (from Los Angeles)
To Los Angeles Lakers

- Russell Westbrook (from Washington)
- 2023 CHI second-round pick (from Washington)
- 2024 second-round pick (from Washington)
- 2028 WAS second-round pick (from Washington)
To San Antonio Spurs

- Chandler Hutchison (from Washington)
- 2022 second-round pick (from Washington)
To Washington Wizards

- Kentavious Caldwell-Pope (from Los Angeles)
- Spencer Dinwiddie (sign-and-trade) (from Brooklyn)
- Montrezl Harrell (from Los Angeles)
- Aaron Holiday (from Indiana)
- Kyle Kuzma (from Los Angeles)
- Draft rights to Isaiah Todd (No. 31) (from Indiana)
- Cash considerations (from Indiana)
August 8, 2021
To Indiana Pacers

- 2023 SAS protected second-round pick (Note: Indiana will receive the pick if it's No. 56-60, otherwise they receive nothing.)
To San Antonio Spurs

- Doug McDermott (sign-and-trade)
- 2023 IND protected second-round pick (Note: San Antonio will receive the pick if it's No. 56-60, otherwise they receive nothing. Indiana traded the No. 31–55 portion of this pick to Sacramento on February 8, 2022.)
- 2026 second-round pick swap right (Note: San Antonio has the right to swap its own pick for the worse of the picks originally belonging to Indiana and Miami.)

August 11, 2021
To Chicago Bulls

- DeMar DeRozan (sign-and-trade)
To San Antonio Spurs

- Al-Farouq Aminu
- Thaddeus Young
- 2022 second-round pick (Note: Before this trade, Chicago had the right to trade its pick for Detroit's, with the worse of the two going to Sacramento; San Antonio could then swap the Lakers' pick for the better of Chicago/Detroit, leaving Chicago with the remaining pick. The pick traded here was the one Chicago would have ended up with after the swap rights were done. San Antonio traded the better of the Chicago and Detroit picks to Toronto on February 10, 2022.)
- 2025 CHI protected first-round pick (Note: Chicago already owes its protected 2023 first-round pick to Orlando, which will convert to two second-round picks if not conveyed by 2024. Because teams cannot trade future first-round picks in consecutive years, San Antonio may not be able to receive the pick until at least 2026. In the first eligible year, San Antonio will receive the pick if it's No. 11-30, in the second or third year (2026 and 2027 or 2027 and 2028) if No. 9-30, after which it will convert to Chicago's 2028 second-round pick.)
- 2025 CHI second-round pick

January 19, 2022
Three-team trade

To Boston Celtics

- Bol Bol (from Denver)
- PJ Dozier (from Denver)
To Denver Nuggets

- Bryn Forbes (from San Antonio)
To San Antonio Spurs

- Juancho Hernangómez (from Boston)
- 2028 DEN protected second-round pick (Note: San Antonio will receive the pick if it's No. 34-60, otherwise they receive nothing.) (from Denver)
- Cash considerations (from Boston)
- Cash considerations (from Denver)
February 9, 2022
Three-team trade

To Portland Trail Blazers

- Elijah Hughes (from Utah)
- Joe Ingles (from Utah)
- 2022 MEM second-round pick (from Utah)
To San Antonio Spurs

- Tomáš Satoranský (from Portland)
- 2027 second-round pick (Note: The worst of the four picks originally belonging to Houston, Indiana, Miami, and Oklahoma City.) (from Utah)
To Utah Jazz

- Nickeil Alexander-Walker (from Portland)
- Juancho Hernangómez (from San Antonio)
February 10, 2022
To Boston Celtics

- Derrick White
To San Antonio Spurs

- Romeo Langford
- Josh Richardson
- 2022 BOS protected first-round pick (Note: San Antonio will receive the pick if it's No. 5–30, in 2023 if No. 5–30; if the pick is not conveyed by 2023, San Antonio will receive Portland's 2023 second-round pick and the better of 1) the 2023 second-round pick originally belonging to Houston (if No. 33–60) or 2) the worse of the picks originally belonging to Dallas and Miami. San Antonio received the pick.)
- 2028 protected first-round pick swap right (Note: If Boston's pick is No. 1, San Antonio will instead receive Boston's second-round pick if it's No. 31–45, otherwise receiving nothing.)

To Toronto Raptors

- Drew Eubanks
- Thaddeus Young
- 2022 second-round pick (Note: The better of the picks originally belonging to Chicago and Detroit.)
To San Antonio Spurs

- Goran Dragić
- 2022 protected first-round pick (Note: San Antonio will receive in 2022 if it's No. 15–30, in 2023 if it's No. 14–30; if the pick is not conveyed by 2023, it will convert to Toronto's second-round picks in 2023 and 2026.)

=== Free agency ===
==== Re-signed ====
Player	Signed
Keita Bates-Diop	September 7, 2021

==== Additions ====
Player	Signed	Former team
Zach Collins	August 11, 2021	Portland Trail Blazers
Jock Landale	August 20, 2021	Melbourne United
Bryn Forbes	August 25, 2021	Milwaukee Bucks

==== Subtractions ====
Player	Left	New team
Trey Lyles	August 6	Detroit Pistons
Gorgui Dieng	August 9	Atlanta Hawks
Rudy Gay	August 9	Utah Jazz
Patty Mills	August 10	Brooklyn Nets
DaQuan Jeffries	October 7	Atlanta Hawks
Luka Šamanić	October 11	New York Knicks
Quinndary Weatherspoon	October 11	Golden State Warriors
