= 2021–22 Portland Trail Blazers season =

National Basketball Association team season

- Head coach: Chauncey Billups
- General manager: Neil Olshey; Joe Cronin (interim)
- Owners: Jody Allen
- Arena: Moda Center

Results
- Record: 27–55 (.329)
- Place: Division: 4th (Northwest); Conference: 13th (Western)
- Playoff finish: Did not qualify
- Stats at Basketball Reference

Local media
- Television: Root Sports Northwest
- Radio: KPOJ, Portland Trail Blazers Radio

The 2021–22 Portland Trail Blazers season was the 52nd season of the franchise in the National Basketball Association (NBA). The Blazers entered the season following a playoff defeat from the Denver Nuggets in the first round of the 2021 NBA playoffs where they lost in six games.

Following the defeat, the Blazers and head coach Terry Stotts mutually agreed to part ways after nine years. Shortly after, the Blazers hired Los Angeles Clippers assistant coach Chauncey Billups to be their head coach.

On August 2, 2021, the Blazers announced coaching staff additions for the 2021–22 season.

After a loss to the San Antonio Spurs on April 1, the Blazers were mathematically eliminated from postseason contention and missed the playoffs for the first time since 2013, ending their nine-year playoff streak. The longest active playoff streak now belongs to the Boston Celtics, making the playoffs every year since the 2014–15 NBA season.

== Draft picks ==
Portland did not hold any picks for the 2021 NBA draft. Their first-round selection was conveyed to the Houston Rockets when Portland made the 2021 NBA playoffs, effectively losing its lottery protection, while their second-round selection was traded to the Cleveland Cavaliers and eventually used by the Memphis Grizzlies in the draft.

== Roster ==
2021–22 Portland Trail Blazers roster
Players

Pos.	No.	Player	Height	Weight	DOB	From
G	5	Eric Bledsoe	6 ft 1 in (1.85 m)	214 lb (97 kg)	1989-12-09	Kentucky
G	21	Keljin Blevins (TW)	6 ft 4 in (1.93 m)	200 lb (91 kg)	1995-11-24	Montana State
F	4	Greg Brown	6 ft 7 in (2.01 m)	206 lb (93 kg)	2001-09-01	Texas
G	18	Kris Dunn	6 ft 3 in (1.91 m)	205 lb (93 kg)	1994-03-18	Providence
G	16	C. J. Elleby	6 ft 6 in (1.98 m)	200 lb (91 kg)	2000-06-16	Washington State
C	24	Drew Eubanks	6 ft 10 in (2.08 m)	245 lb (111 kg)	1997-02-01	Oregon State
G	11	Josh Hart	6 ft 5 in (1.96 m)	215 lb (98 kg)	1995-03-06	Villanova
G	19	Elijah Hughes	6 ft 5 in (1.96 m)	215 lb (98 kg)	1998-03-10	Syracuse
G/F	00	Joe Ingles	6 ft 8 in (2.03 m)	220 lb (100 kg)	1987-10-02	Australia
G	6	Keon Johnson	6 ft 4 in (1.93 m)	185 lb (84 kg)	2002-03-10	Tennessee
G	0	Damian Lillard	6 ft 2 in (1.88 m)	195 lb (88 kg)	1990-07-15	Weber State
G/F	9	Nassir Little	6 ft 5 in (1.96 m)	220 lb (100 kg)	2000-02-11	North Carolina
G	35	Didi Louzada	6 ft 5 in (1.96 m)	188 lb (85 kg)	1999-07-02	Brazil
G	23	Ben McLemore	6 ft 3 in (1.91 m)	195 lb (88 kg)	1993-02-11	Kansas
C	27	Jusuf Nurkić	7 ft 0 in (2.13 m)	290 lb (132 kg)	1994-08-23	Bosnia and Herzegovina
F/C	10	Reggie Perry	6 ft 8 in (2.03 m)	250 lb (113 kg)	2000-03-21	Mississippi State
G	1	Anfernee Simons	6 ft 3 in (1.91 m)	181 lb (82 kg)	1999-06-08	IMG Academy (FL)
F	2	Trendon Watford	6 ft 8 in (2.03 m)	237 lb (108 kg)	2000-11-09	LSU
G	8	Brandon Williams (TW)	6 ft 2 in (1.88 m)	190 lb (86 kg)	1999-11-22	Arizona
G/F	26	Justise Winslow	6 ft 6 in (1.98 m)	222 lb (101 kg)	1997-03-18	Duke

Coaches
Head coach
- Chauncey Billups
Assistant(s)
- Scott Brooks
- Edniesha Curry
- Steve Hetzel
- Milt Palacio
- Roy Rogers

Legend
- (DP) Unsigned draft pick
- (FA) Free agent
- (S) Suspended
- (GL) On assignment to G League
- (TW) Two-way affiliate player
- Injured

Roster
Updated: April 9, 2022

== Standings ==
=== Division ===
Northwest Division	W	L	PCT	GB	Home	Road	Div	GP
y – Utah Jazz	49	33	.598	–	29‍–‍12	20‍–‍21	15–1	82
x – Denver Nuggets	48	34	.585	1.0	23‍–‍18	25‍–‍16	6–10	82
x – Minnesota Timberwolves	46	36	.561	3.0	26‍–‍15	20‍–‍21	12–4	82
Portland Trail Blazers	27	55	.329	22.0	17‍–‍24	10‍–‍31	1–15	82
Oklahoma City Thunder	24	58	.293	25.0	12‍–‍29	12‍–‍29	6–10	82

=== Conference ===
Western Conference
#	Team	W	L	PCT	GB	GP
1	z – Phoenix Suns *	64	18	.780	–	82
2	y – Memphis Grizzlies *	56	26	.683	8.0	82
3	x – Golden State Warriors	53	29	.646	11.0	82
4	x – Dallas Mavericks	52	30	.634	12.0	82
5	y – Utah Jazz *	49	33	.598	15.0	82
6	x – Denver Nuggets	48	34	.585	16.0	82
7	x – Minnesota Timberwolves	46	36	.561	18.0	82
8	pi – Los Angeles Clippers	42	40	.512	22.0	82
9	x – New Orleans Pelicans	36	46	.439	28.0	82
10	pi − San Antonio Spurs	34	48	.415	30.0	82
11	Los Angeles Lakers	33	49	.402	31.0	82
12	Sacramento Kings	30	52	.366	34.0	82
13	Portland Trail Blazers	27	55	.329	37.0	82
14	Oklahoma City Thunder	24	58	.293	40.0	82
15	Houston Rockets	20	62	.244	44.0	82

== Game log ==
=== Preseason ===
2021 preseason game log
Total: 0–3 (Home: 0–2; Road: 0–1)
Preseason: 0–4 (home: 0–2; road: 0–2)

Game	Date	Team	Score	High points	High rebounds	High assists	Location Attendance	Record
1	October 4	Golden State	L 107–121	Damian Lillard (19)	Jusuf Nurkić (10)	Anfernee Simons (6)	Moda Center; 13,936	0–1
2	October 12	Sacramento	L 93–107	Anfernee Simons (24)	Greg Brown (9)	Dennis Smith Jr. (7)	Moda Center; N/A (Note: Spectators were in attendance, but the exact number was not reported.)	0–2
3	October 13	@ Phoenix	L 74–119	Damian Lillard (12)	Jusuf Nurkić (13)	CJ McCollum (4)	Footprint Center; 9,772	0–3
3	October 13	@ Golden State	L 97–119	CJ McCollum (26)	Jusuf Nurkić (10)	Dennis Smith Jr. (4)	Chase Center; 18,064	0–4

2021–22 preseason schedule

=== Regular season ===
2021–22 game log
Total: 27–55 (Home: 17–24; Road: 10–31)
October: 3–3 (home: 3–1; road: 0–2)

Game	Date	Team	Score	High points	High rebounds	High assists	Location Attendance	Record
1	October 20	Sacramento	L 121–124	CJ McCollum (34)	Jusuf Nurkić (14)	Damian Lillard (11)	Moda Center; 17,467	0–1
2	October 23	Phoenix	W 134–105	CJ McCollum (28)	Jusuf Nurkić (12)	Damian Lillard (8)	Moda Center; 18,558	1–1
3	October 25	@ L. A. Clippers	L 86–116	CJ McCollum (20)	Jusuf Nurkić (12)	CJ McCollum (4)	Staples Center; 15,672	1–2
4	October 27	Memphis	W 116–86	CJ McCollum (25)	Jusuf Nurkić (8)	Damian Lillard (10)	Moda Center; 16,241	2–2
5	October 29	L. A. Clippers	W 111–92	Damian Lillard (25)	Jusuf Nurkić (17)	Damian Lillard (6)	Moda Center; 16,510	3–2
6	October 31	@ Charlotte	L 113–125	CJ McCollum (25)	Jusuf Nurkić (14)	Damian Lillard (12)	Spectrum Center; 14,960	3–3

November: 8–8 (home: 7–0; road: 1–8)

Game	Date	Team	Score	High points	High rebounds	High assists	Location Attendance	Record
7	November 1	@ Philadelphia	L 103–113	Norman Powell (22)	Jusuf Nurkić (9)	Damian Lillard (10)	Wells Fargo Center; 20,115	3–4
8	November 3	@ Cleveland	L 104–107	Damian Lillard (26)	Jusuf Nurkić (9)	Damian Lillard (8)	Rocket Mortgage FieldHouse; 16,231	3–5
9	November 5	Indiana	W 110–106	CJ McCollum (27)	Jusuf Nurkić (9)	Damian Lillard (11)	Moda Center; 16,841	4–5
10	November 6	L.A. Lakers	W 105–90	Damian Lillard (25)	Jusuf Nurkić (17)	Damian Lillard (6)	Moda Center; 19,393	5–5
11	November 9	@ L.A. Clippers	L 109–117	Damian Lillard (27)	Jusuf Nurkić (13)	Covington, Lillard, Nurkić (6)	Staples Center; 14,131	5–6
12	November 10	@ Phoenix	L 109–119	Damian Lillard (28)	Lillard, Little (7)	Lillard, McCollum (7)	Footprint Center; 15,672	5–7
13	November 12	@ Houston	W 104–92	Damian Lillard (20)	Nassir Little (14)	Damian Lillard (7)	Toyota Center; 15,468	6–7
14	November 14	@ Denver	L 95–124	CJ McCollum (21)	Nassir Little (7)	Dennis Smith Jr. (5)	Ball Arena; 14,583	6–8
15	November 15	Toronto	W 118–113	CJ McCollum (29)	Jusuf Nurkić (14)	Damian Lillard (8)	Moda Center; 16,142	7–8
16	November 17	Chicago	W 112–107	Damian Lillard (22)	Jusuf Nurkić (12)	Damian Lillard (10)	Moda Center; 17,492	8–8
17	November 20	Philadelphia	W 118–111	Damian Lillard (39)	Jusuf Nurkić (11)	Damian Lillard (7)	Moda Center; 17,027	9–8
18	November 23	Denver	W 119–100	CJ McCollum (32)	Covington, Nurkić (7)	Damian Lillard (5)	Moda Center; 17,052	10–8
19	November 24	@ Sacramento	L 121–125	Damian Lillard (32)	Jusuf Nurkić (17)	Damian Lillard (10)	Golden 1 Center; 14,997	10–9
20	November 26	@ Golden State	L 103–118	Anfernee Simons (19)	CJ McCollum (7)	Damian Lillard (6)	Chase Center; 18,064	10–10
21	November 29	@ Utah	L 107–129	Nurkić, Simons (24)	Jusuf Nurkić (10)	CJ McCollum (6)	Vivint Arena; 18,306	10–11
22	November 30	Detroit	W 110–92	CJ McCollum (28)	Jusuf Nurkić (8)	CJ McCollum (6)	Moda Center; 16,071	11–11

December: 2–11 (home: 1–8; road: 1–3)

Game	Date	Team	Score	High points	High rebounds	High assists	Location Attendance	Record
23	December 2	San Antonio	L 83–114	McCollum, Powell 16	Jusuf Nurkić (7)	Dennis Smith Jr. (5)	Moda Center; 16,143	11–12
24	December 4	Boston	L 117–145	CJ McCollum (24)	Cody Zeller (8)	McCollum, Smith Jr. (6)	Moda Center; 18,193	11–13
25	December 6	L.A. Clippers	L 90–102	Jusuf Nurkić (31)	Robert Covington (10)	Dennis Smith Jr. (7)	Moda Center; 15,865	11–14
26	December 8	@ Golden State	L 94–104	Norman Powell (26)	Jusuf Nurkić (13)	Jusuf Nurkić (6)	Chase Center; 18,064	11–15
27	December 12	Minnesota	L 111–116	Anfernee Simons (26)	Larry Nance Jr. (12)	Damian Lillard (6)	Moda Center; 16,591	11–16
28	December 14	Phoenix	L 107–111 (OT)	Damian Lillard (31)	Jusuf Nurkić (13)	Damian Lillard (10)	Moda Center; 16,184	11–17
29	December 15	Memphis	L 103–113	Norman Powell (25)	Jusuf Nurkić (12)	Norman Powell (5)	Chase Center; 15,773	11–18
30	December 17	Charlotte	W 125–116	Damian Lillard (43)	Robert Covington (10)	Damian Lillard (8)	Moda Center; 18,399	12–18
31	December 19	@ Memphis	W 105–100	Damian Lillard (32)	Nance Jr., Nurkić (11)	Damian Lillard (5)	FedEx Forum; 15,977	13–18
32	December 21	@ New Orleans	L 97–111	Damian Lillard (39)	Larry Nance Jr. (6)	Damian Lillard (7)	Smoothie King Center; 15,272	13–19
33	December 23	Brooklyn	—	Postponed due to COVID-19 pandemic			Moda Center	—
33	December 27	Dallas	L 117–132	Damian Lillard (26)	Nassir Little (10)	Damian Lillard (5)	Moda Center; 18,430	13–20
34	December 29	Utah	L 105–120	Lillard, Powell (32)	Larry Nance Jr. (9)	Larry Nance Jr. (9)	Moda Center; 17,828	13–21
35	December 31	@ L.A. Lakers	L 106–139	Ben McLemore (28)	Larry Nance Jr. (9)	Damian Lillard (7)	Staples Center; 18,997	13–22

January: 8–8 (home: 3–4; road: 5–4)

Game	Date	Team	Score	High points	High rebounds	High assists	Location Attendance	Record
36	January 3	Atlanta	W 136–131	Anfernee Simons (43)	Jusuf Nurkić (12)	Anfernee Simons (7)	Moda Center; 15,091	14–22
37	January 5	Miami	L 109–115	Anfernee Simons (28)	Jusuf Nurkić (13)	Anfernee Simons (7)	Moda Center; 15,773	14–23
38	January 7	Cleveland	L 101–114	Norman Powell (19)	Jusuf Nurkić (12)	Anfernee Simons (7)	Moda Center; 16,708	14–24
39	January 9	Sacramento	W 103–88	Anfernee Simons (31)	Jusuf Nurkić (16)	Jusuf Nurkić (9)	Moda Center; 16,408	15–24
40	January 10	Brooklyn	W 114–108	Anfernee Simons (23)	Jusuf Nurkić (8)	Anfernee Simons (11)	Moda Center; 16,379	16–24
41	January 13	@ Denver	L 108–140	Ben McLemore (18)	Jusuf Nurkić (8)	Dennis Smith Jr. (8)	Ball Arena; 14,972	16–25
42	January 15	@ Washington	W 115–110	Anfernee Simons (31)	Jusuf Nurkić (14)	Anfernee Simons (11)	Capital One Arena; 15,124	17–25
43	January 17	@ Orlando	W 98–88	Jusuf Nurkić (21)	Jusuf Nurkić (22)	Anfernee Simons (7)	Amway Center; 13,648	18–25
44	January 19	@ Miami	L 92–104	Anfernee Simons (27)	Jusuf Nurkić (14)	Anfernee Simons (7)	FTX Arena; 19,600	18–26
45	January 21	@ Boston	W 109–105	Jusuf Nurkić (29)	Jusuf Nurkić (17)	Jusuf Nurkić (6)	TD Garden; 19,156	19–26
46	January 23	@ Toronto	W 114–105	Little, McCollum, Simons (19)	Jusuf Nurkić (11)	McCollum, Smith Jr. (6)	Scotiabank Arena; 0	20–26
47	January 25	Minnesota	L 107–109	Little, Nurkić (20)	Jusuf Nurkić (14)	Anfernee Simons (7)	Moda Center; 16,422	20–27
48	January 26	Dallas	L 112–132	Anfernee Simons (23)	Norman Powell (9)	Anfernee Simons (7)	Moda Center; 16,334	20–28
49	January 28	@ Houston	W 125–110	Anfernee Simons (27)	Jusuf Nurkić (13)	Anfernee Simons (6)	Toyota Center; 16,100	21–28
50	January 30	@ Chicago	L 116–130	CJ McCollum (29)	Robert Covington (7)	Anfernee Simons (6)	United Center; 19,521	21–29
51	January 31	@ Oklahoma City	L 81–98	CJ McCollum (21)	Jusuf Nurkić (9)	CJ McCollum (7)	Paycom Center; 13,812	21–30

February: 4–6 (home: 2–5; road: 2–1)

Game	Date	Team	Score	High points	High rebounds	High assists	Location Attendance	Record
52	February 2	@ L.A. Lakers	L 94–99	Norman Powell (30)	Covington, Nurkić (13)	Robert Covington (9)	Staples Center; 17,259	21–31
53	February 4	Oklahoma City	L 93–96	McCollum, Simons (19)	Jusuf Nurkić (16)	McCollum, Simons (4)	Moda Center; 15,329	21–32
54	February 5	Milwaukee	L 108–137	McLemore, Simons (19)	Jusuf Nurkić (10)	McCollum, Smith Jr. (6)	Moda Center; 19,393	21–33
55	February 8	Orlando	L 95–113	Anfernee Simons (19)	Jusuf Nurkić (11)	Anfernee Simons (5)	Moda Center; 16,024	21–34
56	February 9	L.A. Lakers	W 107–105	Anfernee Simons (29)	Jusuf Nurkić (12)	Dennis Smith Jr. (11)	Moda Center; 19,393	22–34
57	February 12	New York	W 112–103	Anfernee Simons (30)	Jusuf Nurkić (20)	Anfernee Simons (8)	Moda Center; 18,521	23–34
58	February 14	@ Milwaukee	W 122–107	Anfernee Simons (31)	Jusuf Nurkić (16)	Anfernee Simons (6)	Fiserv Forum; 17,341	24–34
59	February 16	@ Memphis	W 123–119	Jusuf Nurkić (32)	Jusuf Nurkić (8)	Anfernee Simons (6)	FedEx Forum; 16,834	25–34
60	February 24	Golden State	L 95–132	Anfernee Simons (24)	Josh Hart (6)	Josh Hart (4)	Moda Center; 19,441	25–35
61	February 27	Denver	L 92–124	Anfernee Simons (16)	Drew Eubanks (10)	Brandon Williams (7)	Moda Center; 17,771	25–36

March: 2–13 (home: 1–5; road: 1–8)

Game	Date	Team	Score	High points	High rebounds	High assists	Location Attendance	Record
62	March 2	@ Phoenix	L 90–120	Brandon Williams (14)	Drew Eubanks (8)	Simons, Watford (6)	Footprint Center; 17,071	25–37
63	March 5	@ Minnesota	L 121–135	Anfernee Simons (38)	Trendon Watford (14)	Blevins, Johnson (5)	Target Center; 17,136	25–38
64	March 7	@ Minnesota	L 81–124	Brandon Williams (27)	Brandon Williams (8)	Josh Hart (4)	Target Center; 16,035	25–39
65	March 9	@ Utah	L 85–123	Trendon Watford (22)	Drew Eubanks (7)	Keon Johnson (5)	Vivint Arena; 18,306	25–40
66	March 12	Washington	W 127–118	Josh Hart (44)	Drew Eubanks (12)	Josh Hart (6)	Moda Center; 17,524	26–40
67	March 14	@ Atlanta	L 113–122	Josh Hart (31)	CJ Elleby (13)	Brandon Williams (6)	State Farm Arena; 16,432	26–41
68	March 16	@ New York	L 98–128	Josh Hart (17)	Drew Eubanks (9)	Kris Dunn (7)	Madison Square Garden; 18,213	26–42
69	March 18	@ Brooklyn	L 123–128	Josh Hart (25)	Eubanks, Williams (6)	Josh Hart (7)	Barclays Center; 17,732	26–43
70	March 20	@ Indiana	L 98–129	Josh Hart (26)	Eubanks, Watford (8)	Kris Dunn (9)	Gainbridge Fieldhouse; 16,067	26–44
71	March 21	@ Detroit	W 119–115	Brandon Williams (23)	Justise Winslow (9)	Kris Dunn (5)	Little Caesars Arena; 14,923	27–44
72	March 23	San Antonio	L 96–133	Ben McLemore (23)	Greg Brown III (14)	Drew Eubanks (4)	Moda Center; 16,610	27–45
73	March 25	Houston	L 106–125	Trendon Watford (19)	CJ Elleby (7)	Kris Dunn (7)	Moda Center; 16,947	27–46
74	March 26	Houston	L 98–115	Watford, Williams (15)	Drew Eubanks (16)	Brandon Williams (8)	Moda Center; 17,821	27–47
75	March 28	Oklahoma City	L 131–134 (OT)	Ben McLemore (28)	Drew Eubanks (14)	Brandon Williams (12)	Moda Center; 18,188	27–48
76	March 30	New Orleans	L 107–117	Drew Eubanks (25)	Drew Eubanks (9)	Brandon Williams (10)	Moda Center; 18,551	27–49

April: 0–6 (home: 0–1; road: 0–5)

Game	Date	Team	Score	High points	High rebounds	High assists	Location Attendance	Record
77	April 1	@ San Antonio	L 111–130	Keon Johnson (20)	Reggie Perry (10)	Kris Dunn (8)	AT&T Center; 17,512	27–50
78	April 3	@ San Antonio	L 92–113	Johnson, McLemore (19)	Drew Eubanks (13)	Brandon Williams (7)	AT&T Center; 15,816	27–51
79	April 5	@ Oklahoma City	L 94–98	Keon Johnson (18)	Kris Dunn (8)	Kris Dunn (8)	Paycom Center; 14,674	27–52
80	April 7	@ New Orleans	L 94–127	Drew Eubanks (20)	Greg Brown III (7)	Keon Johnson (8)	Smoothie King Center; 12,432	27–53
81	April 8	@ Dallas	L 78–128	Drew Eubanks (18)	Elleby, Eubanks (7)	Keon Johnson (6)	American Airlines Center; 20,174	27–54
82	April 10	Utah	L 80–111	Reggie Perry (20)	Reggie Perry (8)	Keon Johnson (6)	Moda Center; 18,123	27–55

2021–22 season schedule

== Player statistics ==
Legend
GP	Games played	GS	Games started	MPG	Minutes per game
FG%	Field-goal percentage	3P%	3-point field-goal percentage	FT%	Free-throw percentage
RPG	Rebounds per game	APG	Assists per game	SPG	Steals per game
BPG	Blocks per game	PPG	Points per game

=== Regular season ===
Portland Trail Blazers statistics
Player	GP	GS	MPG	FG%	3P%	FT%	RPG	APG	SPG	BPG	PPG
Ben McLemore	64	6	20.1	.401	.362	.818	1.6	.9	.6	.2	10.2
C. J. Elleby	58	28	20.2	.393	.294	.714	3.9	1.5	.6	.3	5.8
Anfernee Simons	57	30	29.5	.443	.405	.888	2.6	3.9	.5	.1	17.3
Jusuf Nurkić	56	56	28.2	.535	.268	.690	11.1	2.8	1.1	.6	15.0
Robert Covington^{†}	48	40	29.8	.381	.343	.833	5.7	1.4	1.5	1.3	7.6
Trendon Watford	48	10	18.1	.532	.237	.755	4.1	1.7	.5	.6	7.6
Greg Brown III	48	6	13.3	.426	.311	.677	2.8	.7	.5	.5	4.7
Nassir Little	42	23	25.9	.460	.331	.734	5.6	1.3	.6	.9	9.8
Norman Powell^{†}	40	39	33.3	.456	.406	.803	3.3	2.1	1.0	.4	18.7
Tony Snell^{†}	38	10	14.4	.371	.320	1.000	1.9	.5	.2	.2	2.6
Larry Nance Jr.^{†}	37	11	23.2	.515	.306	.653	5.6	2.0	1.0	.4	6.9
Dennis Smith Jr.	37	4	17.2	.418	.222	.656	2.4	3.6	1.2	.3	5.6
CJ McCollum^{†}	36	36	35.2	.436	.384	.706	4.3	4.5	1.0	.6	20.5
Keljin Blevins	31	1	11.3	.306	.292	.545	1.5	.6	.4	.0	3.1
Damian Lillard	29	29	36.4	.402	.324	.878	4.1	7.3	.6	.4	24.0
Cody Zeller	27	0	13.1	.567	.000	.776	4.6	.8	.3	.2	5.2
Brandon Williams	24	16	26.7	.372	.292	.701	3.1	3.9	1.0	.4	12.9
Drew Eubanks^{†}	22	22	29.5	.646	.267	.784	8.5	1.6	.8	.5	14.5
Keon Johnson^{†}	22	12	25.5	.357	.348	.833	2.7	2.9	1.0	.5	9.7
Elijah Hughes^{†}	22	3	14.6	.296	.224	.667	1.9	.7	.5	.3	3.8
Kris Dunn	14	3	24.0	.431	.091	.944	3.5	5.6	1.6	.2	7.6
Josh Hart^{†}	13	13	32.1	.503	.373	.772	5.4	4.3	1.2	.2	19.9
Justise Winslow^{†}	11	10	26.8	.405	.270	.560	6.3	2.9	1.3	.6	10.7
Reggie Perry^{†}	9	1	19.7	.500	.188	.600	5.1	1.3	1.0	.7	10.0
Didi Louzada^{†}	7	1	17.4	.400	.450	1.000	2.1	.6	.3	.3	5.0
Cameron McGriff	3	0	15.3	.357	.333	1.000	5.0	1.0	.0	.3	4.7
Jarron Cumberland	3	0	4.0	.500	.000		1.0	.3	.0	.0	.7

- ^{†} Denotes player spent time with another team in the season. Stats reflect time with the Trail Blazers only.

== Transactions ==
=== Overview ===
Players Added

Via trade
- Larry Nance Jr.
- Eric Bledsoe
- Justise Winslow
- Keon Johnson
- Josh Hart
- Tomáš Satoranský
- Nickeil Alexander-Walker
- Didi Louzada
- Joe Ingles
- Elijah Hughes

Via free agency

- Trendon Watford
- Cody Zeller
- Ben McLemore
- Tony Snell
- Greg Brown
Players Lost

Via trade
- Derrick Jones Jr.
- Robert Covington
- Norman Powell
- CJ McCollum
- Larry Nance, Jr.
- Nickeil Alexander-Walker
- Tomáš Satoranský

Via free agency

- Carmelo Anthony
- Zach Collins
- Enes Kanter
- Harry Giles
- Rondae Hollis-Jefferson
- T.J. Leaf
- Cody Zeller

=== Trades ===
August 28, 2021	To Portland Trail Blazers Larry Nance Jr.	To Cleveland Cavaliers Lauri Markkanen
August 28, 2021	To Chicago Bulls Derrick Jones Jr. 2022 POR protected first-round pick 2023 CLE second-round pick	
February 5, 2022	To Portland Trail Blazers Eric Bledsoe; Justise Winslow; Keon Johnson; 2025 DET second-round pick	To Los Angeles Clippers Robert Covington; Norman Powell
February 8, 2022	To Portland Trail Blazers Josh Hart; Tomáš Satoranský; Nickeil Alexander-Walker; Didi Louzada; 2022 NOP protected first-round pick 2026 NOP second-round pick 2027 NOP second-round pick	To New Orleans Pelicans CJ McCollum; Larry Nance, Jr. Tony Snell
February 9, 2022	To Portland Trail Blazers Joe Ingles; Elijah Hughes; 2022 MEM second-round pick	To Utah Jazz Nickeil Alexander-Walker; Juancho Hernangómez
February 9, 2022	To San Antonio Spurs Tomáš Satoranský; 2027 UTA second-round pick	

=== Free agency ===
==== Re-signed ====
Player	Signed
Norman Powell	August 6, 2021

==== Additions ====
Player	Signed	Former team
Trendon Watford	August 3, 2021	LSU
Cody Zeller	August 4, 2021	Charlotte Hornets
Ben McLemore	August 6, 2021	Los Angeles Lakers
Tony Snell	August 10, 2021	Atlanta Hawks
Greg Brown	August 12, 2021	Texas

==== Subtractions ====
Player	Reason left	New team
Carmelo Anthony	Free agency	Los Angeles Lakers
Zach Collins	Free agency	San Antonio Spurs
Enes Kanter	Free agency	Boston Celtics
Harry Giles	Free agency	Los Angeles Clippers
Rondae Hollis-Jefferson	Free agency	Beşiktaş Icrypex
T. J. Leaf	Free agency	Guangzhou Loong Lions
Cody Zeller	Waived	
