= Brandon Williams (basketball, born 1999) =

American basketball player (born 1999)

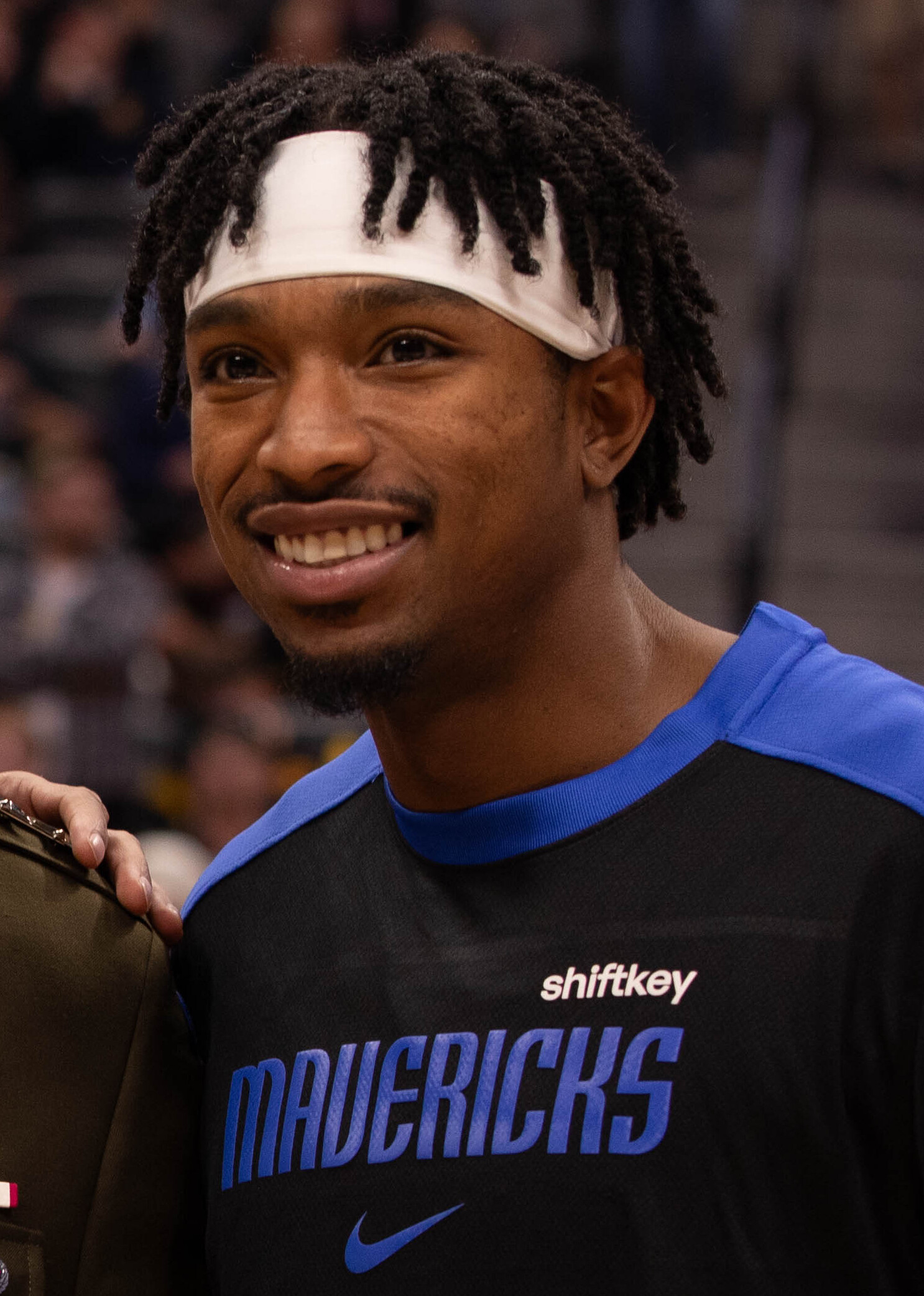
- Williams with the Dallas Mavericks in 2024

No. 12 – Golden State Warriors
- Position: Point guard
- League: NBA

Personal information
- Born: November 22, 1999 (age 26) Los Angeles, California, U.S.
- Listed height: 6 ft 1 in (1.85 m)
- Listed weight: 185 lb (84 kg)

Career information
- High school: Crespi Carmelite (Encino, California)
- College: Arizona (2018–2019)
- NBA draft: 2021: undrafted
- Playing career: 2021–present

Career history
- 2021–2022: Westchester Knicks
- 2021–2022: Portland Trail Blazers
- 2022–2023: College Park Skyhawks
- 2023: Osceola Magic
- 2023–2026: Dallas Mavericks
- 2023–2025: →Texas Legends
- 2026–present: Golden State Warriors
- Stats at NBA.com
- Stats at Basketball Reference

Brandon Tory Williams (born November 22, 1999) is an American professional basketball player for the Golden State Warriors of the National Basketball Association (NBA). He played college basketball for the Arizona Wildcats.

== High school career ==
Williams attended Crespi Carmelite High School in Encino, California, where he was a four-star recruit and committed to playing college basketball for Arizona in May 2018.

== College career ==
Williams played the 2018–19 season for the Wildcats, averaging 11.4 points per game and earning honorable mention Pac-12 Conference All-Freshman team honors. He had knee surgery in 2019, missing what would have been his sophomore season. He left Arizona in 2020 to heal and to prepare for his eventual professional career.

== Professional career ==
=== Portland Trail Blazers / Westchester Knicks (2021) ===
After going undrafted in the 2021 NBA draft, Williams joined the Westchester Knicks of the NBA G League in October 2021. He averaged 17.7 points, 4 rebounds and 4.7 assists per game in 10 games.

On December 26, 2021, the Portland Trail Blazers of the National Basketball Association (NBA) signed Williams to a 10-day contract to fill out the roster after several players were lost due to COVID-19 health and safety protocols.

On January 5, 2022, Williams was re-acquired by the Westchester Knicks. On January 22, he scored a career-high 35 points and had eight assists in a 142–117 loss to the Maine Celtics.

On February 22, 2022, Williams signed a two-way contract with the Portland Trail Blazers. He was waived on October 7.

=== College Park Skyhawks (2022–2023) ===
On November 4, 2022, Williams was named to the opening night roster for the College Park Skyhawks.

=== Osceola Magic (2023) ===
On September 12, 2023, Williams signed with the Orlando Magic, but was waived on October 21. On November 2, he joined the Osceola Magic.

=== Dallas Mavericks (2023–2026) ===
On December 28, 2023, Williams signed a two-way contract with the Dallas Mavericks. Williams reached the 2024 NBA Finals where the Mavericks lost to the Boston Celtics in five games. He was re-signed on July 12, 2024, to a two-way contract.

On March 7, 2025, Williams recorded a career-high 31 points against the Memphis Grizzlies. On April 8, he was signed to a multi-year contract by the Mavericks. Williams made 33 appearances (including three starts) for Dallas during the 2024–25 NBA season, averaging 8.3 points, 1.8 rebounds and 2.3 assists.

Williams played in 66 games (starting 16) for the Mavericks during the 2025–26 season, recording averages of 13.0 points (a career high), 2.9 rebounds and 3.9 assists.

=== Golden State Warriors (2026–present) ===
On August 26, 2026, Williams signed a one-year contract with the Golden State Warriors. On October 21, he made his Warriors debut, recording 14 points, four rebounds, three assists and three steals in a 127–105 loss to the Los Angeles Lakers.

== Personal life ==
On October 25, 2025, Williams was arrested at Dallas Fort Worth International Airport after less than two ounces of marijuana were found in his luggage.

== Career statistics ==
Legend
| GP | Games played | GS | Games started | MPG | Minutes per game |
| FG% | Field goal percentage | 3P% | 3-point field goal percentage | FT% | Free throw percentage |
| RPG | Rebounds per game | APG | Assists per game | SPG | Steals per game |
| BPG | Blocks per game | PPG | Points per game | **Bold** | Career high |

=== NBA ===
| Year | Team | GP | GS | MPG | FG% | 3P% | FT% | RPG | APG | SPG | BPG | PPG |
|---|---|---|---|---|---|---|---|---|---|---|---|---|
| 2021–22 | Portland | 24 | **16** | **26.7** | .372 | .292 | .701 | **3.1** | **3.9** | **1.0** | **.4** | 12.9 |
| 2023–24 | Dallas | 17 | 0 | 6.6 | .370 | .200 | .647 | .8 | 1.0 | .1 | .1 | 3.2 |
| 2024–25 | Dallas | **33** | 3 | 14.8 | **.521** | **.400** | **.833** | 1.8 | 2.3 | .7 | .2 | 8.3 |
| 2025–26 | Dallas | 66 | 15 | 22.2 | .472 | .232 | .793 | 2.9 | **3.9** | .9 | .3 | **13.0** |
| Career | | 140 | 34 | 19.3 | .450 | .280 | .775 | 2.4 | 3.2 | .8 | .3 | 10.7 |

=== College ===
| Year | Team | GP | GS | MPG | FG% | 3P% | FT% | RPG | APG | SPG | BPG | PPG |
|---|---|---|---|---|---|---|---|---|---|---|---|---|
| 2018–19 | Arizona | 26 | 21 | 28.2 | .377 | .316 | .819 | 2.8 | 3.4 | .8 | .2 | 11.4 |
| 2019–20 | Arizona | Redshirt | | | | | | | | | | |
