= Justise Winslow =

American basketball player (born 1996)

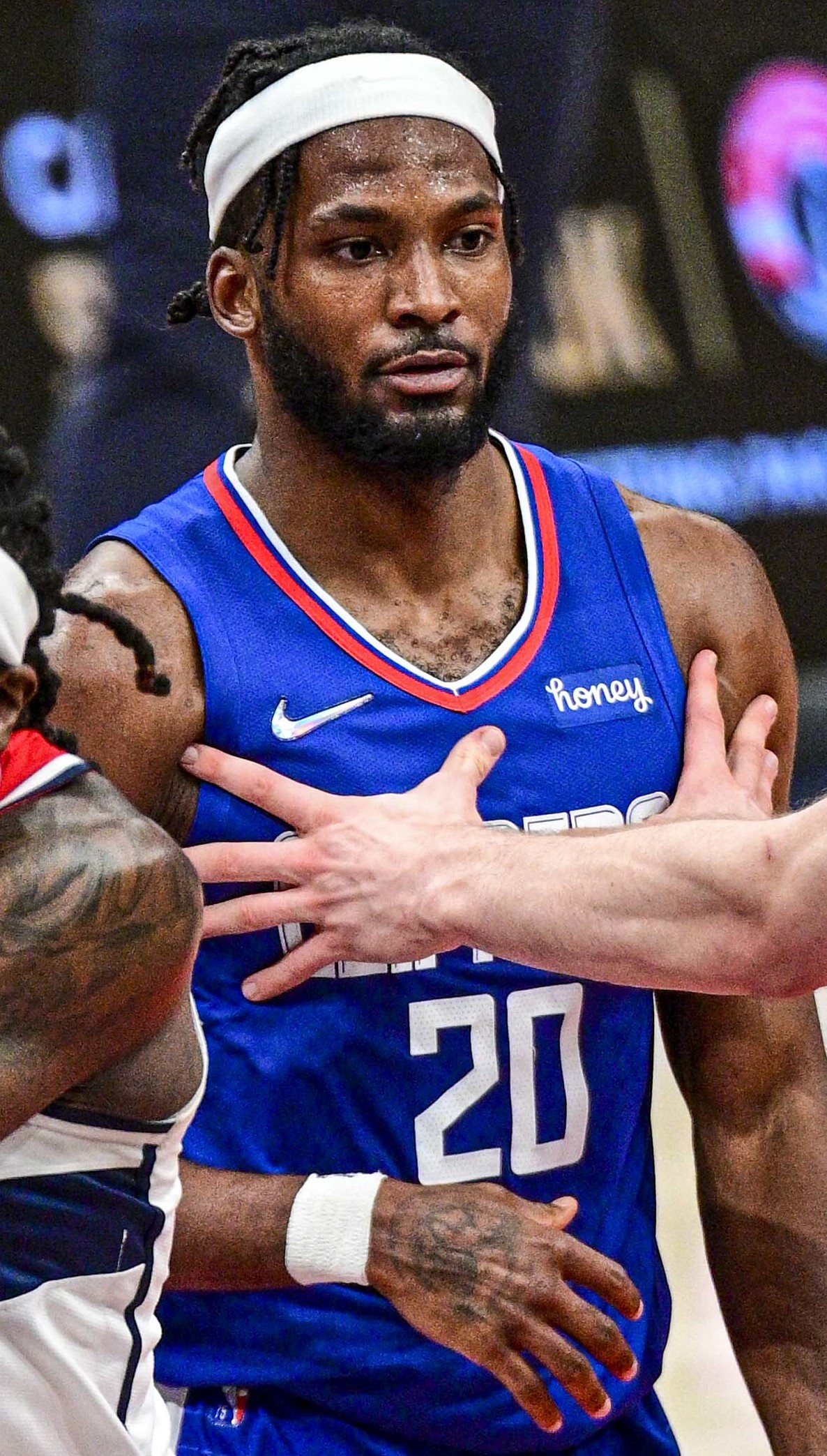
- Winslow with the Los Angeles Clippers in 2022

Free agent
- Position: Small forward / power forward

Personal information
- Born: March 26, 1996 (age 29) Houston, Texas, U.S.
- Listed height: 6 ft 6 in (1.98 m)
- Listed weight: 222 lb (101 kg)

Career information
- High school: St. John's (Houston, Texas)
- College: Duke (2014–2015)
- NBA draft: 2015: 1st round, 10th overall pick
- Drafted by: Miami Heat
- Playing career: 2015–present

Career history
- 2015–2020: Miami Heat
- 2020–2021: Memphis Grizzlies
- 2021–2022: Los Angeles Clippers
- 2022–2023: Portland Trail Blazers
- 2023–2024: Raptors 905
- 2024–2025: Wisconsin Herd

Career highlights
- NBA All-Rookie Second Team (2016); NCAA champion (2015); ACC All-Freshman team (2015); McDonald's All-American (2014); First-team Parade All-American (2014); Texas Mr. Basketball (2014)
- Stats at NBA.com
- Stats at Basketball Reference
Medals
Men's basketball
Representing United States
FIBA World U19 Cup
Gold medal – first place	2013 Czech Republic	National team
FIBA Americas U18 Championship
Gold medal – first place	2014 United States	National team
FIBA World U17 Cup
Gold medal – first place	2012 Lithuania	National team

Justise Jon Winslow (born March 26, 1996) is an American professional basketball player who last played for the Wisconsin Herd of the NBA G League. He played college basketball for the Duke Blue Devils, with whom he won the 2015 NCAA championship.

== High school career ==
Winslow was a four-year starter at St. John's School in Houston, Texas. He started and ended his career at St. John's with league championships. He was the 2013 Gatorade Texas Player of the Year and averaged 27.5 points, 13.6 rebounds, 3.5 assists, 2.1 blocks, and 1.8 steals per game as a senior in 2013–14. Winslow was selected as a McDonald's All-American in 2014.

== College career ==
Winslow averaged 14 points and five rebounds in his first five games in a Duke uniform. Duke coach Mike Krzyzewski compared Winslow's game to that of former Duke stars Tommy Amaker and Grant Hill. On February 9, 2015, Winslow was named ACC Freshman of the Week, and later earned honorable mention All-ACC honors. In the NCAA tournament, Winslow averaged 14.3 points and 9.3 rebounds per game en route to a national championship. He played in 39 games for Duke as a freshman, averaging 12.6 points, 6.5 rebounds, 2.1 assists, and 1.3 steals in 29.1 minutes per game.

In April 2015, Winslow declared for the NBA draft, forgoing his final three years of collegiate eligibility.

== Professional career ==
=== Miami Heat (2015–2020) ===
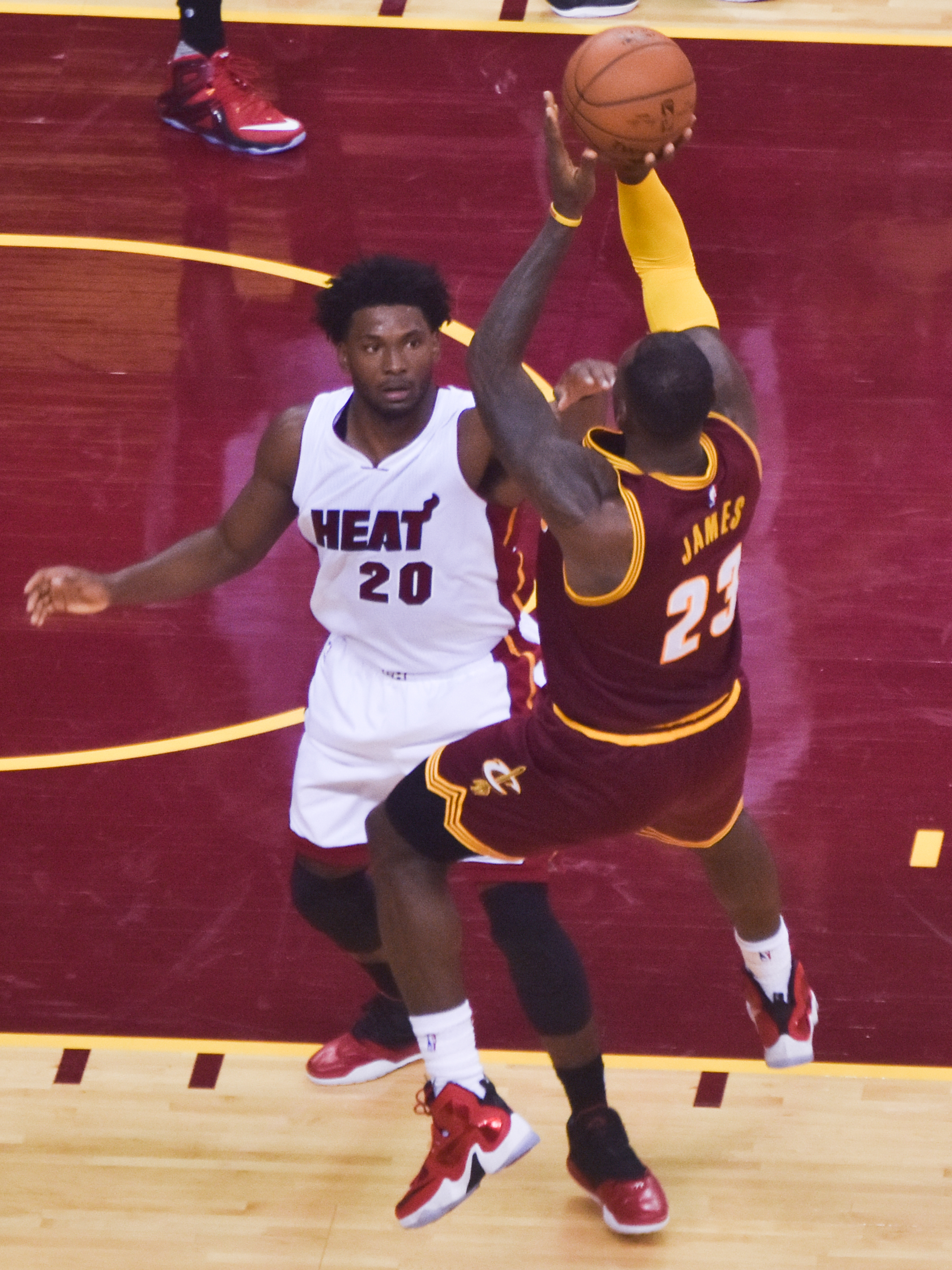
Winslow defending LeBron James in October 2015

On June 26, 2015, Winslow was selected by the Miami Heat with the 10th overall pick in the 2015 NBA draft. On July 3, 2015, he signed his rookie scale contract with the Heat. He made his debut for the team in their season opener against the Charlotte Hornets on October 28, recording five points and seven rebounds off the bench in a 104–94 win. On November 6, he had a then season-best game with 13 points and eight rebounds in a loss to the Indiana Pacers. On January 11, he made his first career start, recording seven points and three rebounds in a loss to the Golden State Warriors. On February 22, he recorded a season-high 15 points, seven rebounds and four assists in 39 minutes off the bench in a 101–93 win over the Indiana Pacers. On March 14, he topped his season-high mark with 20 points in a 124–119 win over the Denver Nuggets. During his rookie year, coach Erik Spoelstra consistently called on Winslow to defend the most lethal attackers in the league, from LeBron James to James Harden, as he developed into a defensive stopper. At the season's end, he earned NBA All-Rookie Second Team honors.

Winslow started the Heat's first nine games of the 2016–17 season before missing the next 16 with a sore left wrist. On December 22, 2016, he had a season-best game with 23 points and 13 rebounds in a 115–107 win over the Los Angeles Lakers, as he set a career high for points and tied a career best in rebounds. On January 5, 2017, Winslow was ruled out for the rest of the season after undergoing surgery to repair a torn labrum in his right shoulder.

Winslow played in the first 27 games of the 2017–18 season but then missed 14 games with a knee strain. On February 5, he scored 16 points against the Orlando Magic. He twice scored 17 points between February 24 and March 1, before setting a season-best 18 points on April 4 against the Atlanta Hawks. On March 12, he recorded 15 points and a season-high 13 rebounds against the Portland Trail Blazers. In Game 3 of the Heat's first-round playoff series against the Philadelphia 76ers, Winslow scored a season-high 19 points in a 128–108 loss.

On November 3, 2018, in his first start of the 2018–19 season, Winslow had 15 points, 10 rebounds and eight assists in a 123–118 loss to the Atlanta Hawks. On December 10, he scored a career-high 28 points with six 3-pointers in a 108–105 loss to the Los Angeles Lakers. After teammate and starting point guard Goran Dragić suffered a right knee injury, Winslow was named as Miami's starting point guard in mid-December. On December 28, he posted 24 points, 11 rebounds, and seven assists in a 118–94 win over the Cleveland Cavaliers. On January 10, he recorded a career-high 11 assists in a 115–99 win over the Boston Celtics.

Winslow played in only 11 games for the Heat during the 2019–20 season as he was sidelined with a back injury.

=== Memphis Grizzlies (2020–2021) ===
On February 6, 2020, Winslow was acquired by the Memphis Grizzlies in a three-team trade also involving the Minnesota Timberwolves. On July 21, the Grizzlies announced that Winslow had suffered a hip injury during team practice and would miss the rest of the 2019–20 season.

=== Los Angeles Clippers (2021–2022) ===
On August 8, 2021, Winslow signed a two-year contract with the Los Angeles Clippers.

=== Portland Trail Blazers (2022–2023) ===
On February 4, 2022, Winslow was traded, alongside Eric Bledsoe, Keon Johnson, and a 2025 second-round pick, to the Portland Trail Blazers in exchange for Norman Powell and Robert Covington.

On December 21, 2022, during a 101–98 loss to the Oklahoma City Thunder, Winslow exited the game with a left ankle injury. On December 26, the Trail Blazers announced that he had been diagnosed with a Grade 2 ankle sprain and would be re-evaluated in two weeks. After the All-Star break, Winslow received a second opinion on his injury and underwent a bone marrow aspirate concentrate procedure in March to address further discomfort in his left ankle. On March 29, he underwent season-ending left ankle surgery.

=== Raptors 905 (2023–2024) ===
On October 20, 2023, Winslow signed with the Toronto Raptors, but was waived the same day. On October 30, 2023, Winslow joined Raptors 905.

On February 10, 2024, Winslow signed a 10-day contract with Toronto, but didn't play for them. On February 20, he returned to Raptors 905.

=== Wisconsin Herd (2024–2025) ===
On October 16, 2024, Winslow signed with the Milwaukee Bucks, but was waived the next day. On October 28, he joined the Wisconsin Herd.

== Career statistics ==
Legend
GP	Games played	GS	Games started	MPG	Minutes per game
FG%	Field goal percentage	3P%	3-point field goal percentage	FT%	Free throw percentage
RPG	Rebounds per game	APG	Assists per game	SPG	Steals per game
BPG	Blocks per game	PPG	Points per game	**Bold**	Career high

=== NBA ===
==== Regular season ====
Year	Team	GP	GS	MPG	FG%	3P%	FT%	RPG	APG	SPG	BPG	PPG
2015–16	Miami	**78**	8	28.6	.422	.276	.684	5.2	1.5	.9	.3	6.4
2016–17	Miami	18	15	**34.7**	.356	.200	.617	5.2	3.7	**1.4**	.3	10.9
2017–18	Miami	68	25	24.7	.424	**.380**	.635	5.4	2.2	.8	.5	7.8
2018–19	Miami	66	**52**	29.7	.433	.375	.628	5.4	**4.3**	1.1	.3	**12.6**
2019–20	Miami	11	5	32.0	.388	.222	.667	**6.6**	4.0	.6	.5	11.3
2020–21	Memphis	26	1	19.5	.352	.185	.571	4.5	1.9	.6	.5	6.8
2021–22	L.A. Clippers	37	1	12.9	**.447**	.172	.610	3.6	1.4	.6	.5	4.2
2021–22	Portland	11	10	26.8	.405	.270	.560	6.3	2.9	1.3	**.6**	10.7
2022–23	Portland	29	11	26.8	.409	.311	**.714**	5.0	3.4	1.0	.4	6.8
Career		344	128	25.9	.412	.315	.638	5.1	2.6	.9	.4	8.2

==== Playoffs ====
Year	Team	GP	GS	MPG	FG%	3P%	FT%	RPG	APG	SPG	BPG	PPG
2016	Miami	**13**	**2**	**25.4**	**.432**	.278	.700	4.8	.6	.6	.3	6.9
2018	Miami	5	0	25.0	.357	**.368**	**.706**	**6.6**	**2.6**	**.8**	**.8**	**9.8**
2021	Memphis	1	0	3.0	.000	.000	.000	1.0	1.0	.0	.0	.0
Career		19	2	24.1	.405	.324	.702	5.1	1.2	.6	.4	7.3

=== College ===
Year	Team	GP	GS	MPG	FG%	3P%	FT%	RPG	APG	SPG	BPG	PPG
2014–15	Duke	39	39	29.1	.486	.418	.641	6.5	2.1	1.3	.9	12.6

== National team career ==
In 2012, Winslow played for the United States at the FIBA Under-17 World Championship, where he was named to the All-Tournament Team. In 2013, he played at the FIBA Under-19 World Championship. In 2014, he played at the FIBA Americas Under-18 Championship.

== Personal life ==
Winslow is the son of Robin Davis and Rickie Winslow. His father played basketball for the University of Houston from 1983 to 1987, where he was a member of the famed Phi Slama Jama team that included Hakeem Olajuwon and Clyde Drexler, and was selected 28th overall by the Chicago Bulls in the 1987 NBA draft. Winslow has three older brothers, Cedrick, Brandon and Josh; and an older sister, Bianca. His brother, Josh, played football at Dartmouth, while his sister, Bianca, was a basketball player at Houston.
