= 2021–22 Brooklyn Nets season =

Season of National Basketball Association team the Brooklyn Nets

- Head coach: Steve Nash
- General manager: Sean Marks
- Owners: Joseph Tsai
- Arena: Barclays Center

Results
- Record: 44–38 (.537)
- Place: Division: 4th (Atlantic); Conference: 7th (Eastern)
- Playoff finish: First round (lost to Celtics 0–4)
- Stats at Basketball Reference

Local media
- Television: YES Network, WPIX
- Radio: WFAN AM/FM

The 2021–22 Brooklyn Nets season was the 46th season of the franchise in the National Basketball Association (NBA), 55th season overall, and its 10th season playing in the New York City borough of Brooklyn.

On February 10, 2022, the Nets sent superstar James Harden and Paul Millsap to the Philadelphia 76ers in a blockbuster deal, in return for Seth Curry, Andre Drummond, Ben Simmons, and two first-round picks. This trade ended the superteam era of the Nets.

On April 2, 2022, the Nets clinched a spot in the play-in tournament. On April 12, the Nets clinched a playoff spot after winning the play-in game against the Cleveland Cavaliers. In the first round of the 2022 NBA playoffs, they faced the Boston Celtics, losing the series 4–0. It was the second time in three seasons that the Nets were swept in the first round of the playoffs; in the 2020 playoffs, they were swept by the Toronto Raptors.

== Draft ==
2021 NBA draft picks
Round	Pick	Player	Position	Nationality	School/club
1	27	Cam Thomas	SG	United States	LSU
2	44	Kessler Edwards	SF	United States	Pepperdine
2	49	Marcus Zegarowski	PG	United States	Creighton
2	59	RaiQuan Gray	PF	United States	Florida State

The Nets entered the draft holding one first-round pick and three second-round picks. The 44th overall pick was acquired on July 7, 2016, in a trade with the Indiana Pacers. The 49th overall pick was acquired on July 6, 2019, in a trade with the Atlanta Hawks. The 59th overall pick was acquired on July 20, 2018, in a trade with the Phoenix Suns. The Nets used their 27th overall pick to select Cam Thomas, and then selected Kessler Edwards (44th overall pick), Marcus Zegarowski (49th overall pick) and RaiQuan Gray (59th overall pick).

== Roster ==
Brooklyn Nets roster
Players

Pos.	No.	Player	Height	Weight	DOB	From
F/C	21	LaMarcus Aldridge	6 ft 11 in (2.11 m)	250 lb (113 kg)	1985-07-19	Texas
G	1	Bruce Brown	6 ft 4 in (1.93 m)	202 lb (92 kg)	1996-08-15	Miami (FL)
F/C	33	Nic Claxton	6 ft 11 in (2.11 m)	215 lb (98 kg)	1999-04-17	Georgia
G	30	Seth Curry	6 ft 2 in (1.88 m)	185 lb (84 kg)	1990-08-23	Duke
G	9	Goran Dragić	6 ft 3 in (1.91 m)	190 lb (86 kg)	1986-05-06	Slovenia
C	0	Andre Drummond	6 ft 11 in (2.11 m)	279 lb (127 kg)	1993-08-10	Connecticut
G	6	David Duke (TW)	6 ft 4 in (1.93 m)	204 lb (93 kg)	1999-10-13	Providence
F	7	Kevin Durant	6 ft 10 in (2.08 m)	240 lb (109 kg)	1988-09-29	Texas
F	14	Kessler Edwards	6 ft 7 in (2.01 m)	203 lb (92 kg)	2000-08-09	Pepperdine
F	2	Blake Griffin	6 ft 9 in (2.06 m)	250 lb (113 kg)	1989-03-16	Oklahoma
G/F	12	Joe Harris (injured)	6 ft 6 in (1.98 m)	220 lb (100 kg)	1991-09-07	Virginia
G	11	Kyrie Irving	6 ft 2 in (1.88 m)	195 lb (88 kg)	1992-03-23	Duke
G	8	Patty Mills	6 ft 0 in (1.83 m)	180 lb (82 kg)	1988-08-11	Saint Mary's
C	20	Day'Ron Sharpe	6 ft 10 in (2.08 m)	265 lb (120 kg)	2001-11-06	North Carolina
G/F	10	Ben Simmons (injured)	6 ft 11 in (2.11 m)	240 lb (109 kg)	1996-07-20	LSU
G	24	Cam Thomas	6 ft 3 in (1.91 m)	210 lb (95 kg)	2001-10-13	LSU

Coaches
Head coach
- Steve Nash
Assistant(s)
- Ryan Forehan-Kelly
- Adam Harrington
- Royal Ivey
- Brian Keefe
- Jordan Ott
- Tiago Splitter
- David Vanterpool
- Jacque Vaughn

Legend
- (DP) Unsigned draft pick
- (FA) Free agent
- (S) Suspended
- (GL) On assignment to G League affiliate
- (TW) Two-way affiliate player
- Injured

Roster
Updated: April 25, 2022

== Standings ==
=== Division ===
Atlantic Division	W	L	PCT	GB	Home	Road	Div	GP
y – Boston Celtics	51	31	.622	–	28‍–‍13	23‍–‍18	9–7	82
x – Philadelphia 76ers	51	31	.622	–	24‍–‍17	27‍–‍14	6–10	82
x – Toronto Raptors	48	34	.585	3.0	24‍–‍17	24‍–‍17	10–6	82
x − Brooklyn Nets	44	38	.537	7.0	20‍–‍21	24‍–‍17	10–6	82
New York Knicks	37	45	.451	14.0	17‍–‍24	20‍–‍21	5–11	82

=== Conference ===
Eastern Conference
#	Team	W	L	PCT	GB	GP
1	c – Miami Heat *	53	29	.646	–	82
2	y – Boston Celtics *	51	31	.622	2.0	82
3	y – Milwaukee Bucks *	51	31	.622	2.0	82
4	x – Philadelphia 76ers	51	31	.622	2.0	82
5	x – Toronto Raptors	48	34	.585	5.0	82
6	x – Chicago Bulls	46	36	.561	7.0	82
7	x − Brooklyn Nets	44	38	.537	9.0	82
8	pi − Cleveland Cavaliers	44	38	.537	9.0	82
9	x − Atlanta Hawks	43	39	.524	10.0	82
10	pi − Charlotte Hornets	43	39	.524	10.0	82
11	New York Knicks	37	45	.451	16.0	82
12	Washington Wizards	35	47	.427	18.0	82
13	Indiana Pacers	25	57	.305	28.0	82
14	Detroit Pistons	23	59	.280	30.0	82
15	Orlando Magic	22	60	.268	31.0	82

== Game log ==
=== Preseason ===
The preseason schedule was announced on August 10, 2021.

2021 preseason game log
Total: 3–1 (home: 2–0; road: 1–1)
Preseason: 3–1 (home: 2–0; road: 1–1)

Game	Date	Team	Score	High points	High rebounds	High assists	Location Attendance	Record
1	October 3	@ L.A. Lakers	W 123–97	Thomas (21)	Millsap (10)	Aldridge, Millsap (3)	Staples Center; 16,000	1–0
2	October 8	Milwaukee	W 119–115	Durant (18)	Durant (6)	Griffin (5)	Barclays Center; 12,770	2–0
3	October 11	@ Philadelphia	L 104–115	Durant (23)	Durant (7)	Harden (4)	Wells Fargo Center; 14,522	2–1
4	October 14	Minnesota	W 107–101	Harris (23)	Millsap (9)	Harden (14)	Barclays Center; 11,210	3–1

2021–22 preseason schedule

=== Regular season ===
The regular season schedule was released on August 20, 2021.

2021–22 game log
Total: 44–38 (home: 20–21; road: 24–17)
October: 4–3 (home: 3–2; road: 1–1)

Game	Date	Team	Score	High points	High rebounds	High assists	Location Attendance	Record
1	October 19	@ Milwaukee	L 104–127	Durant (32)	Durant (11)	Harden (8)	Fiserv Forum; 17,341	0–1
2	October 22	@ Philadelphia	W 114–109	Durant (29)	Durant (15)	Durant (12)	Wells Fargo Center; 20,367	1–1
3	October 24	Charlotte	L 95–111	Durant (38)	Aldridge (8)	Harden (8)	Barclays Center; 17,732	1–2
4	October 25	Washington	W 104–90	Durant (25)	Griffin (9)	Harden (9)	Barclays Center; 14,487	2–2
5	October 27	Miami	L 93–106	Durant (25)	Durant (11)	Harden (7)	Barclays Center; 17,732	2–3
6	October 29	Indiana	W 105–98	Harden (29)	Durant (11)	Harden (8)	Barclays Center; 16,139	3–3
7	October 31	Detroit	W 117–91	Durant (23)	Harden (10)	Harden (12)	Barclays Center; 13,507	4–3

November: 11–3 (home: 4–2; road: 7–1)

Game	Date	Team	Score	High points	High rebounds	High assists	Location Attendance	Record
8	November 3	Atlanta	W 117–108	Durant (32)	Durant, Griffin (7)	Harden (11)	Barclays Center; 17,323	5–3
9	November 5	@ Detroit	W 96–90	Durant (29)	Durant, Harden (10)	Harden (10)	Little Caesars Arena; 14,235	6–3
10	November 7	@ Toronto	W 116–103	Durant (31)	Griffin (11)	Harden (8)	Scotiabank Arena; 19,800	7–3
11	November 8	@ Chicago	L 95–118	Durant (38)	Durant (11)	Harden (5)	United Center; 19,459	7–4
12	November 10	@ Orlando	W 123–90	Durant (30)	Harden (11)	Harden (11)	Amway Center; 13,882	8–4
13	November 12	@ New Orleans	W 120–112	Harden (39)	Durant (7)	Harden (12)	Smoothie King Center; 14,650	9–4
14	November 14	@ Oklahoma City	W 120–96	Durant (33)	Aldridge, Durant (8)	Harden (13)	Paycom Center; 15,080	10–4
15	November 16	Golden State	L 99–117	Harden (24)	Sharpe (7)	Harden, Mills (4)	Barclays Center; 17,732	10–5
16	November 17	Cleveland	W 109–99	Harden (27)	Brown, Harden (10)	Harden (7)	Barclays Center; 16,922	11–5
17	November 19	Orlando	W 115–113	Harden (36)	Harden, Johnson (10)	Harden (8)	Barclays Center; 16,966	12–5
18	November 22	@ Cleveland	W 117–112	Durant (27)	Aldridge (11)	Harden (14)	Rocket Mortgage FieldHouse; 17,387	13–5
19	November 24	@ Boston	W 123–104	Mills (23)	Bembry (10)	Harden (11)	TD Garden; 19,156	14–5
20	November 27	Phoenix	L 107–113	Durant (39)	Harden (13)	Harden (14)	Barclays Center; 18,071	14–6
21	November 30	New York	W 112–110	Harden (34)	Harden (10)	Durant (9)	Barclays Center; 18,081	15–6

December: 8–4 (home: 3–3; road: 5–1)

Game	Date	Team	Score	High points	High rebounds	High assists	Location Attendance	Record
22	December 3	Minnesota	W 110–105	Durant (30)	Durant (10)	Harden (9)	Barclays Center; 17,732	16–6
23	December 4	Chicago	L 107–111	Durant (28)	Brown (12)	Harden (14)	Barclays Center; 18,116	16–7
24	December 7	@ Dallas	W 102–99	Durant (24)	Claxton, Harden (9)	Harden (12)	American Airlines Center; 19,559	17–7
25	December 8	@ Houston	L 104–114	Harden (25)	Harden (11)	Harden (8)	Toyota Center; 15,834	17–8
26	December 10	@ Atlanta	W 113–105	Durant (31)	Johnson (8)	Harden (11)	State Farm Arena; 17,074	18–8
27	December 12	@ Detroit	W 116–104	Durant (51)	Durant (7)	Durant (9)	Little Caesars Arena; 15,289	19–8
28	December 14	Toronto	W 131–129 (OT)	Durant (34)	Duke Jr., Durant (13)	Durant (11)	Barclays Center; 17,325	20–8
29	December 16	Philadelphia	W 114–105	Durant (34)	Durant (11)	Durant (8)	Barclays Center; 17,053	21–8
30	December 18	Orlando	L 93–100	Mills (23)	Duke Jr. (14)	Griffin (6)	Barclays Center; 16,292	21–9
—	December 19	Denver	—	Postponed due to COVID-19 pandemic; moved to January 26			Barclays Center	—
—	December 21	Washington	—	Postponed due to COVID-19 pandemic; moved to February 17			Barclays Center	—
—	December 23	@ Portland	—	Postponed due to COVID-19 pandemic; moved to January 10			Moda Center	—
31	December 25	@ L.A. Lakers	W 122–115	Harden (36)	Harden (10)	Harden (10)	Crypto.com Arena; 18,997	22–9
32	December 27	@ L.A. Clippers	W 124–108	Harden (39)	Griffin (9)	Harden (15)	Crypto.com Arena; 17,128	23–9
33	December 30	Philadelphia	L 102–110	Durant, Harden (33)	Harden (14)	Harden (10)	Barclays Center; 17,920	23–10

January: 6–10 (home: 2–6; road: 4–4)

Game	Date	Team	Score	High points	High rebounds	High assists	Location Attendance	Record
34	January 1	L.A. Clippers	L 116–120	Harden (34)	Harden (12)	Harden (13)	Barclays Center; 17,732	23–11
35	January 3	Memphis	L 104–118	Durant (26)	Brown (7)	Harden (8)	Barclays Center; 17,089	23–12
36	January 5	@ Indiana	W 129–121	Durant (39)	Durant (8)	Durant (7)	Gainbridge Fieldhouse; 14,176	24–12
37	January 7	Milwaukee	L 109–121	Durant (29)	Durant (8)	Durant, Harden (7)	Barclays Center; 17,732	24–13
38	January 9	San Antonio	W 121–119 (OT)	Durant (28)	Claxton (14)	Harden (12)	Barclays Center; 15,606	25–13
39	January 10	@ Portland	L 108–114	Durant (28)	Durant (10)	Durant, Mills (5)	Moda Center; 16,379	25–14
40	January 12	@ Chicago	W 138–112	Durant (27)	Harden, Sharpe (7)	Harden (16)	United Center; 21,698	26–14
41	January 13	Oklahoma City	L 109–130	Harden (26)	Millsap (10)	Harden (9)	Barclays Center; 16,964	26–15
42	January 15	New Orleans	W 120–105	Harden (27)	Sharpe (10)	Harden (15)	Barclays Center; 17,034	27–15
43	January 17	@ Cleveland	L 107–114	Irving (27)	Harden, Irving (7)	Harden (10)	Rocket Mortgage FieldHouse; 18,105	27–16
44	January 19	@ Washington	W 119–118	Irving (30)	Harden (8)	Harden (9)	Capital One Arena; 15,380	28–16
45	January 21	@ San Antonio	W 117–102	Harden (37)	Harden, Sharpe (10)	Harden (11)	AT&T Center; 15,068	29–16
46	January 23	@ Minnesota	L 125–136	Irving (30)	Sharpe (9)	Harden (13)	Target Center; 16,475	29–17
47	January 25	L.A. Lakers	L 96–106	Harden (33)	Harden (12)	Harden (11)	Barclays Center; 18,126	29–18
48	January 26	Denver	L 118–124	Thomas (25)	Aldridge, Johnson (8)	Johnson (7)	Barclays Center; 18,011	29–19
49	January 29	@ Golden State	L 106–110	Irving (32)	Claxton (8)	Irving (7)	Chase Center; 18,064	29–20

February: 3–10 (home: 1–4; road: 2–6)

Game	Date	Team	Score	High points	High rebounds	High assists	Location Attendance	Record
50	February 1	@ Phoenix	L 111–121	Irving (26)	Griffin (6)	Harden (10)	Footprint Center; 17,071	29–21
51	February 2	@ Sacramento	L 101–112	Claxton (23)	Claxton (11)	Harden (12)	Golden 1 Center; 13,153	29–22
52	February 4	@ Utah	L 102–125	Thomas (30)	Sharpe (8)	Irving (6)	Vivint Arena; 18,306	29–23
53	February 6	@ Denver	L 104–124	Irving (27)	Edwards (6)	Irving (11)	Ball Arena; 18,241	29–24
54	February 8	Boston	L 91–126	Carter (21)	Sharpe (9)	Johnson (5)	Barclays Center; 17,732	29–25
55	February 10	@ Washington	L 112–113	Irving (31)	Sharpe (10)	Irving (6)	Capital One Arena; 15,204	29–26
56	February 12	@ Miami	L 111–115	Irving (29)	Sharpe (12)	Irving (5)	FTX Arena; 19,600	29–27
57	February 14	Sacramento	W 109–85	Curry (23)	Drummond (9)	Brown (6)	Barclays Center; 16,873	30–27
58	February 16	@ New York	W 111–106	Thomas (21)	Drummond (19)	Curry (6)	Madison Square Garden; 18,916	31–27
59	February 17	Washington	L 103–117	Mills (22)	Drummond (9)	Brown, Curry (4)	Barclays Center; 17,477	31–28
60	February 24	Boston	L 106–129	Curry (22)	Brown, Curry (7)	Johnson (6)	Barclays Center; 17,986	31–29
61	February 26	@ Milwaukee	W 126–123	Irving (38)	Drummond (12)	Drummond, Irving (5)	Fiserv Forum; 17,341	32–29
62	February 28	Toronto	L 97–133	Aldridge (15)	Sharpe (7)	Dragić (5)	Barclays Center; 17,112	32–30

March: 8–7 (home: 4–4; road: 4–3)

Game	Date	Team	Score	High points	High rebounds	High assists	Location Attendance	Record
63	March 1	@ Toronto	L 108–109	Johnson (19)	Aldridge (9)	Curry (6)	Scotiabank Arena; 18,903	32–31
64	March 3	Miami	L 107–113	Durant (31)	Aldridge, Brown, Durant, Thomas (4)	Dragić (7)	Barclays Center; 17,732	32–32
65	March 6	@ Boston	L 120–126	Durant (37)	Drummond (7)	Durant (8)	TD Garden; 19,156	32–33
66	March 8	@ Charlotte	W 132–121	Irving (50)	Drummond (14)	Dragić, Durant (7)	Spectrum Center; 17,230	33–33
67	March 10	@ Philadelphia	W 129–100	Durant (25)	Durant (14)	Dragić, Durant (7)	Wells Fargo Center; 21,408	34–33
68	March 13	New York	W 110–107	Durant (53)	Drummond (10)	Durant (9)	Barclays Center; 18,057	35–33
69	March 15	@ Orlando	W 150–108	Irving (60)	Claxton (10)	Brown (8)	Amway Center; 15,282	36–33
70	March 16	Dallas	L 111–113	Durant (23)	Drummond (17)	Durant (10)	Barclays Center; 17,981	36–34
71	March 18	Portland	W 128–123	Durant (38)	Claxton, Drummond (9)	Dragić (10)	Barclays Center; 17,732	37–34
72	March 21	Utah	W 114–106	Durant (37)	Durant (9)	Durant (8)	Barclays Center; 17,887	38–34
73	March 23	@ Memphis	L 120–132	Irving (43)	Durant (11)	Durant, Irving (8)	FedExForum; 17,794	38–35
74	March 26	@ Miami	W 110–95	Durant (23)	Drummond (11)	Irving (6)	FTX Arena; 19,600	39–35
75	March 27	Charlotte	L 110–119	Durant (27)	Drummond (17)	Irving (11)	Barclays Center; 18,166	39–36
76	March 29	Detroit	W 130–123	Durant (41)	Drummond (13)	Durant (5)	Barclays Center; 17,559	40–36
77	March 31	Milwaukee	L 119–120 (OT)	Durant (26)	Drummond (10)	Durant (11)	Barclays Center; 17,917	40–37

April: 4–1 (home: 3–0; road: 1–1)

Game	Date	Team	Score	High points	High rebounds	High assists	Location Attendance	Record
78	April 2	@ Atlanta	L 115–122	Durant (55)	Drummond (13)	Irving (6)	State Farm Arena; 18,126	40–38
79	April 5	Houston	W 118–105	Irving (42)	Drummond (11)	Durant (7)	Barclays Center; 17,768	41–38
80	April 6	@ New York	W 110–98	Durant (32)	Durant (10)	Durant (11)	Madison Square Garden; 19,812	42–38
81	April 8	Cleveland	W 118–107	Durant (36)	Drummond (12)	Brown, Irving (8)	Barclays Center; 18,169	43–38
82	April 10	Indiana	W 134–126	Irving (35)	Drummond (13)	Durant (16)	Barclays Center; 17,967	44–38

2021–22 season schedule

=== Play-in ===
2022 play-in game log
Total: 1–0 (home: 1–0; road: 0–0)
Play-in: 1–0 (home: 1–0; road: 0–0)

Game	Date	Team	Score	High points	High rebounds	High assists	Location Attendance	Record
1	April 12	Cleveland	W 115–108	Irving (34)	Brown, Claxton (9)	Irving (12)	Barclays Center; 17,732	1–0

2021–22 season schedule

=== Playoffs ===
2022 playoff game log
Total: 0–4 (home: 0–2; road: 0–2)
First round: 0–4 (home: 0–2; road: 0–2)

Game	Date	Team	Score	High points	High rebounds	High assists	Location Attendance	Series
1	April 17	@ Boston	L 114–115	Irving (39)	Claxton (8)	Curry, Irving (6)	TD Garden; 19,156	0–1
2	April 20	@ Boston	L 107–114	Durant (27)	Brown, Irving (8)	Durant (5)	TD Garden; 19,156	0–2
3	April 23	Boston	L 103–109	Brown (26)	Brown, Durant (8)	Irving (9)	Barclays Center; 18,175	0–3
4	April 25	Boston	L 112–116	Durant (39)	Dragić (8)	Durant (9)	Barclays Center; 18,099	0–4

2022 playoff schedule

== Player statistics ==
Legend
GP	Games played	GS	Games started	MPG	Minutes per game
FG%	Field-goal percentage	3P%	3-point field-goal percentage	FT%	Free-throw percentage
RPG	Rebounds per game	APG	Assists per game	SPG	Steals per game
BPG	Blocks per game	PPG	Points per game

=== Regular season statistics ===
As of April 10, 2022

Brooklyn Nets statistics
Player	GP	GS	MPG	FG%	3P%	FT%	RPG	APG	SPG	BPG	PPG
LaMarcus Aldridge	47	12	22.3	.550	.304	.873	5.5	.9	.3	1.0	12.9
DeAndre' Bembry	48	20	19.8	.568	.417	.600	3.2	1.3	1.0	.5	5.8
Bruce Brown	72	45	24.6	.506	.404	.758	4.8	2.1	1.1	.7	9.0
Jevon Carter	46	1	12.0	.333	.331	.700	1.5	1.0	.3	.2	3.6
Nic Claxton	47	19	20.7	.674	—	.581	5.6	.9	.5	1.1	8.7
Seth Curry	19	19	29.9	.493	.468	.857	2.6	2.6	.9	.2	14.9
Goran Dragić	16	6	25.5	.376	.245	.739	3.2	4.8	.9	.2	7.3
Andre Drummond	24	24	22.3	.610	.000	.537	10.3	1.4	.9	1.0	11.8
David Duke Jr.	22	7	15.5	.361	.243	.810	3.0	.8	.6	.3	4.7
Kevin Durant	55	55	37.2	.518	.383	.910	7.4	6.4	.9	.9	29.9
Kessler Edwards	48	23	20.6	.412	.353	.842	3.6	.6	.6	.5	5.9
James Ennis III	2	0	7.0	.286	.500	—	2.5	.0	.5	.5	2.5
Wenyen Gabriel	1	0	1.0	—	—	—	1.0	.0	.0	.0	.0
Langston Galloway	4	0	14.5	.385	.250	—	2.0	1.3	.0	.0	3.0
Blake Griffin	56	24	17.1	.425	.262	.724	4.1	1.9	.5	.3	6.4
James Harden	44	44	37.0	.414	.332	.869	8.0	10.2	1.3	.7	22.5
Joe Harris	14	14	30.2	.452	.466	.833	4.0	1.0	.5	.1	11.3
Shaquille Harrison	2	0	11.5	.333	.000	—	2.0	1.5	.5	.5	2.0
Kyrie Irving	29	29	37.6	.469	.418	.915	4.4	5.8	1.4	.6	27.4
James Johnson	62	10	19.2	.469	.271	.527	3.5	2.1	.5	.5	5.5
Patty Mills	81	48	29.0	.408	.400	.814	1.9	2.3	.6	.2	11.4
Paul Millsap	24	0	11.3	.376	.222	.706	3.7	1.0	.2	.5	3.4
Day'Ron Sharpe	32	8	12.2	.577	.286	.585	5.0	.5	.3	.5	6.2
Cam Thomas	67	2	17.6	.433	.270	.829	2.4	1.2	.5	.1	8.5

=== Playoff statistics ===
As of April 25, 2022

Brooklyn Nets statistics
Player	GP	GS	MPG	FG%	3P%	FT%	RPG	APG	SPG	BPG	PPG
Bruce Brown	4	4	34.8	.568	.429	.800	4.8	2.8	1.3	.8	14.0
Nic Claxton	4	0	24.5	.792	—	.182	6.3	1.5	1.3	2.3	10.5
Seth Curry	4	4	33.0	.564	.522	.667	2.5	3.0	.3	.8	14.5
Goran Dragić	4	0	19.8	.563	.333	1.000	4.5	1.5	.8	.0	10.5
Andre Drummond	4	4	15.0	.545	—	.600	3.0	.8	1.3	.8	3.8
Kevin Durant	4	4	44.0	.386	.333	.895	5.8	6.3	1.0	.3	26.3
Kessler Edwards	2	0	3.5	—	—	—	.0	.5	.5	.0	.0
Blake Griffin	2	0	12.5	.286	.400	1.000	2.0	2.0	.5	.5	4.0
Kyrie Irving	4	4	42.5	.444	.381	1.000	5.3	5.3	1.8	1.3	21.3
Patty Mills	4	0	18.0	.563	.538	—	1.0	.0	.0	.3	6.3
Day'Ron Sharpe	1	0	0.4	—	—	—	.0	.0	.0	.0	.0
Cam Thomas	1	0	0.4	—	—	—	.0	.0	.0	.0	.0

== Transactions ==
=== Trades ===
August 6, 2021	To Brooklyn Nets Jevon Carter; Draft rights to Day'Ron Sharpe	To Phoenix Suns Landry Shamet
August 6, 2021	To Brooklyn Nets Draft rights to Nikola Milutinov; 2024 second-round pick 2025 second-round pick swap	To Washington Wizards Kentavious Caldwell-Pope; Spencer Dinwiddie; Montrezl Harrell; Aaron Holiday; Kyle Kuzma; Draft rights to Isaiah Todd; Cash considerations
August 6, 2021	To Los Angeles Lakers Russell Westbrook; 2023 second-round pick 2024 second-round pick 2028 second-round pick	To Indiana Pacers Draft rights to Isaiah Jackson
August 6, 2021	To San Antonio Spurs Chandler Hutchison; 2022 second-round pick	
September 4, 2021	To Brooklyn Nets Sekou Doumbouya; Jahlil Okafor	To Detroit Pistons DeAndre Jordan; 2022 second-round pick 2024 second-round pick 2025 second-round pick 2027 second-round pick Cash considerations
October 6, 2021	To Brooklyn Nets Cash considerations	To Houston Rockets Sekou Doumbouya; 2024 second-round pick
October 6, 2021	To Brooklyn Nets Edmond Sumner; 2025 second-round pick	To Indiana Pacers Draft rights to Juan Pablo Vaulet
February 10, 2022	To Brooklyn Nets Seth Curry; Andre Drummond; Ben Simmons; 2022 first-round pick 2027 first-round pick	To Philadelphia 76ers James Harden; Paul Millsap

=== Additions ===
Date	Player	Former team	Ref
August 6, 2021	James Johnson	New Orleans Pelicans	
August 8, 2021	DeAndre' Bembry	Toronto Raptors	
August 8, 2021	David Duke Jr.	Providence Friars	
August 9, 2021	Patty Mills	San Antonio Spurs	
September 10, 2021	Paul Millsap	Denver Nuggets	
September 20, 2021	Devontae Cacok	Los Angeles Lakers	
October 11, 2021	Jordan Bowden	Long Island Nets	
October 11, 2021	Brandon Rachal	Tulsa Golden Hurricane	
December 16, 2021	Langston Galloway	College Park Skyhawks	
December 18, 2021	James Ennis III	Orlando Magic	
December 18, 2021	Shaquille Harrison	Delaware Blue Coats	
December 21, 2021	Wenyen Gabriel	Wisconsin Herd	
December 27, 2021	Langston Galloway	—	
December 29, 2021	Shaquille Harrison	—	
February 22, 2022	Goran Dragić	Toronto Raptors	

=== Subtractions ===
Date	Player	New team	Ref
August 12, 2021	Jeff Green	Denver Nuggets	
August 14, 2021	Chris Chiozza	Golden State Warriors	
September 3, 2021	Alize Johnson	Chicago Bulls	
September 9, 2021	Jahlil Okafor	Atlanta Hawks	
September 17, 2021	Mike James	AS Monaco Basket	
September 21, 2021	Reggie Perry	Toronto Raptors	
September 22, 2021	Timothé Luwawu-Cabarrot	Atlanta Hawks	
October 15, 2021	Jordan Bowden	Long Island Nets	
October 15, 2021	Brandon Rachal	Long Island Nets	
October 16, 2021	Devontae Cacok	San Antonio Spurs	
December 22, 2021	Tyler Johnson	Philadelphia 76ers	
December 28, 2021	James Ennis III	Los Angeles Clippers	
December 31, 2021	Wenyen Gabriel	Los Angeles Clippers	
January 7, 2022	Langston Galloway	Milwaukee Bucks	
January 9, 2022	Shaquille Harrison	Delaware Blue Coats	
February 10, 2022	DeAndre' Bembry	Milwaukee Bucks	
February 22, 2022	Jevon Carter	Milwaukee Bucks	
April 7, 2022	James Johnson	Indiana Pacers	
