= 2021–22 Milwaukee Bucks season =

- Division champions
- Head coach: Mike Budenholzer
- General manager: Jon Horst
- Owners: Wesley Edens; Marc Lasry
- Arena: Fiserv Forum

Results
- Record: 51–31 (.622)
- Place: Division: 1st (Central); Conference: 3rd (Eastern)
- Playoff finish: Conference semifinals (lost to Celtics 3–4)
- Stats at Basketball Reference

Local media
- Television: Bally Sports Wisconsin
- Radio: WTMJ

The 2021–22 Milwaukee Bucks season was the 54th season of the franchise in the National Basketball Association (NBA). The Bucks entered the season as defending champions after winning the 2021 NBA Finals against the Phoenix Suns in the previous season in six games as the first team since the 2015–16 Cleveland Cavaliers to come back after trailing 2–0.

On August 20, 2021, the NBA announced that the regular season for the league would begin October 19, 2021 and would return to the normal 82-game schedule for the first time since the 2018–19 season. The Bucks beat the Chicago Bulls in the first round in five games, but lost to the eventual Conference champion Boston Celtics in seven games in the conference semifinals, in their third playoff matchup in five seasons.

== Draft picks ==
Round	Pick	Player	Position(s)	Nationality	School/Club
2	31	Isaiah Todd	Power forward	United States	NBA G League Ignite

The Bucks had one second-round pick entering the draft; it originally belonged to the Houston Rockets through a March 2021 trade. In exchange, they had traded away their own original first-round selection, a move triggered by Houston holding a more favorable second-round draft position than the Philadelphia 76ers after clinching the worst record of the previous season. The Bucks had also traded their original second-round selection to the Cleveland Cavaliers in 2018 and eventually used by the Indiana Pacers in the draft.

They would use their only selection at the start of the second round to select power forward Isaiah Todd from the recently created NBA G League Ignite franchise, though they would later trade Todd away to Indiana, who in turn traded him to the Washington Wizards.

== Roster ==
2021–22 Milwaukee Bucks roster
Players

Pos.	No.	Player	Height	Weight	DOB	From
G	7	Grayson Allen	6 ft 4 in (1.93 m)	198 lb (90 kg)	1995-10-08	Duke
F	34	Giannis Antetokounmpo (C)	7 ft 0 in (2.13 m)	242 lb (110 kg)	1994-12-06	Greece
F	43	Thanasis Antetokounmpo	6 ft 7 in (2.01 m)	219 lb (99 kg)	1992-07-18	Greece
G	5	Jevon Carter	6 ft 1 in (1.85 m)	200 lb (91 kg)	1995-09-14	West Virginia
G	24	Pat Connaughton	6 ft 5 in (1.96 m)	209 lb (95 kg)	1993-01-06	Notre Dame
G	3	George Hill	6 ft 4 in (1.93 m)	188 lb (85 kg)	1986-05-04	IUPUI
G	21	Jrue Holiday	6 ft 3 in (1.91 m)	205 lb (93 kg)	1990-06-12	UCLA
F/C	25	Serge Ibaka	7 ft 0 in (2.13 m)	235 lb (107 kg)	1989-09-18	Republic of the Congo
C	11	Brook Lopez	7 ft 1 in (2.16 m)	282 lb (128 kg)	1988-04-01	Stanford
C	54	Sandro Mamukelashvili (TW)	6 ft 9 in (2.06 m)	240 lb (109 kg)	1999-05-23	Seton Hall
G	23	Wesley Matthews	6 ft 4 in (1.93 m)	220 lb (100 kg)	1986-10-14	Marquette
F	22	Khris Middleton (C)	6 ft 7 in (2.01 m)	222 lb (101 kg)	1991-08-12	Texas A&M
F	13	Jordan Nwora	6 ft 8 in (2.03 m)	225 lb (102 kg)	1998-09-09	Louisville
F/C	9	Bobby Portis	6 ft 10 in (2.08 m)	250 lb (113 kg)	1995-02-10	Arkansas
G	59	Rayjon Tucker	6 ft 5 in (1.96 m)	210 lb (95 kg)	1997-09-24	Little Rock
G	6	Luca Vildoza	6 ft 3 in (1.91 m)	190 lb (86 kg)	1995-08-11	Argentina
G	28	Lindell Wigginton (TW)	6 ft 1 in (1.85 m)	189 lb (86 kg)	1998-03-28	Iowa State

Coaches
Head coach
- Mike Budenholzer
Assistant(s)
- Vin Baker
- Mike Dunlap
- Chad Forcier
- Darvin Ham
- Charles Lee
- Josh Oppenheimer
- Patrick St. Andrews

Legend
- (DP) Unsigned draft pick
- (FA) Free agent
- (S) Suspended
- (GL) On assignment to G League affiliate
- (TW) Two-way affiliate player
- Injured

Roster
Updated: April 7, 2022

== Standings ==
=== Division ===
Central Division	W	L	PCT	GB	Home	Road	Div	GP
y – Milwaukee Bucks	51	31	.622	–	27‍–‍14	24‍–‍17	12–4	82
x – Chicago Bulls	46	36	.561	5.0	27‍–‍14	19‍–‍22	10–6	82
pi − Cleveland Cavaliers	44	38	.537	7.0	25‍–‍16	19‍–‍22	10–6	82
Indiana Pacers	25	57	.305	26.0	16‍–‍25	9‍–‍32	2–14	82
Detroit Pistons	23	59	.280	28.0	13‍–‍28	10‍–‍31	6–10	82

=== Conference ===
Eastern Conference
#	Team	W	L	PCT	GB	GP
1	c – Miami Heat *	53	29	.646	–	82
2	y – Boston Celtics *	51	31	.622	2.0	82
3	y – Milwaukee Bucks *	51	31	.622	2.0	82
4	x – Philadelphia 76ers	51	31	.622	2.0	82
5	x – Toronto Raptors	48	34	.585	5.0	82
6	x – Chicago Bulls	46	36	.561	7.0	82
7	x − Brooklyn Nets	44	38	.537	9.0	82
8	pi − Cleveland Cavaliers	44	38	.537	9.0	82
9	x − Atlanta Hawks	43	39	.524	10.0	82
10	pi − Charlotte Hornets	43	39	.524	10.0	82
11	New York Knicks	37	45	.451	16.0	82
12	Washington Wizards	35	47	.427	18.0	82
13	Indiana Pacers	25	57	.305	28.0	82
14	Detroit Pistons	23	59	.280	30.0	82
15	Orlando Magic	22	60	.268	31.0	82

== Game log ==
=== Preseason ===
2021 preseason game log
Total: 1–4 (home: 1–1; road: 0–3)
Preseason: 1–4 (home: 1–1; road: 0–3)

Game	Date	Team	Score	High points	High rebounds	High assists	Location Attendance	Record
1	October 5	@ Memphis	L 77–87	Jordan Nwora (16)	Lopez, Mamukelashvili (7)	Connaughton, Nwora, Robinson, Mamukelashvili (3)	FedExForum; N/A (Note: Spectators were in attendance, but the exact number was not reported.)	0–1
2	October 8	@ Brooklyn	L 115–119	Jordan Nwora (30)	Sandro Mamukelashvili (11)	Tremont Waters (5)	Barclays Center; 12,770	0–2
3	October 10	Oklahoma City	W 130–110	Jordan Nwora (15)	Giannis Antetokounmpo (9)	Giannis Antetokounmpo (6)	Fiserv Forum; 12,442	1–2
4	October 13	@ Utah	L 120–124	Khris Middleton (25)	Sandro Mamukelashvili (7)	G. Antetokounmpo, Holiday (5)	Vivint Arena; 16,016	1–3
5	October 15	Dallas	L 103–114	Giannis Antetokounmpo (26)	Giannis Antetokounmpo (10)	Jrue Holiday (8)	Fiserv Forum; 12,946	1–4

2020–21 season schedule

=== Regular season ===
2021–22 game log
Total: 51–31 (home: 27–14; road: 24–17)
October: 3–4 (home: 1–3; road: 2–1)

Game	Date	Team	Score	High points	High rebounds	High assists	Location Attendance	Record
1	October 19	Brooklyn	W 127–104	Giannis Antetokounmpo (32)	Giannis Antetokounmpo (14)	Giannis Antetokounmpo (7)	Fiserv Forum; 17,341	1–0
2	October 21	@ Miami	L 95–137	Giannis Antetokounmpo (15)	Giannis Antetokounmpo (10)	Middleton, Connaughton (4)	FTX Arena; 19,600	1–1
3	October 23	@ San Antonio	W 121–111	Khris Middleton (28)	Giannis Antetokounmpo (8)	Giannis Antetokounmpo (8)	AT&T Center; 14,353	2–1
4	October 25	@ Indiana	W 119–109	Giannis Antetokounmpo (30)	Giannis Antetokounmpo (10)	Giannis Antetokounmpo (9)	Gainbridge Fieldhouse; 10,339	3–1
5	October 27	Minnesota	L 108–113	Giannis Antetokounmpo (40)	Giannis Antetokounmpo (16)	Giannis Antetokounmpo (7)	Fiserv Forum; 17,341	3–2
6	October 30	San Antonio	L 93–102	Giannis Antetokounmpo (28)	Giannis Antetokounmpo (13)	Khris Middleton (5)	Fiserv Forum; 17,341	3–3
7	October 31	Utah	L 95–107	Giannis Antetokounmpo (25)	Thanasis Antetokounmpo (9)	Giannis Antetokounmpo (6)	Fiserv Forum; 17,341	3–4

November: 10–4 (home: 5–1; road: 5–3)

Game	Date	Team	Score	High points	High rebounds	High assists	Location Attendance	Record
8	November 2	@ Detroit	W 117–89	Giannis Antetokounmpo (28)	G. Antetokounmpo, T. Antetokounmpo, Portis (8)	Giannis Antetokounmpo (9)	Little Caesars Arena; 9,254	4–4
9	November 5	New York	L 98–113	Giannis Antetokounmpo (25)	Giannis Antetokounmpo (7)	Antetokounmpo, Hill (4)	Fiserv Forum; 17,341	4–5
10	November 7	@ Washington	L 94–101	Giannis Antetokounmpo (29)	Giannis Antetokounmpo (18)	Giannis Antetokounmpo (5)	Capital One Arena; 15,570	4–6
11	November 9	@ Philadelphia	W 118–109	Giannis Antetokounmpo (31)	Giannis Antetokounmpo (16)	Jrue Holiday (6)	Wells Fargo Center; 20,029	5–6
12	November 10	@ New York	W 112–100	Pat Connaughton (23)	Giannis Antetokounmpo (15)	Giannis Antetokounmpo (8)	Madison Square Garden; 18,027	6–6
13	November 12	@ Boston	L 113–122	Bobby Portis (22)	Semi Ojeleye (7)	Jrue Holiday (13)	TD Garden; 19,156	6–7
14	November 14	@ Atlanta	L 100–120	Giannis Antetokounmpo (26)	Bobby Portis (8)	Jrue Holiday (8)	State Farm Arena; 16,901	6–8
15	November 17	L. A. Lakers	W 109–102	Giannis Antetokounmpo (47)	Antetokounmpo, Hill (9)	Jrue Holiday (8)	Fiserv Forum; 17,341	7–8
16	November 19	Oklahoma City	W 96–89	Giannis Antetokounmpo (21)	Giannis Antetokounmpo (19)	Giannis Antetokounmpo (7)	Fiserv Forum; 17,341	8–8
17	November 20	Orlando	W 117–108	Giannis Antetokounmpo (32)	Giannis Antetokounmpo (20)	Khris Middleton (8)	Fiserv Forum; 17,341	9–8
18	November 22	Orlando	W 123–92	Jrue Holiday (18)	Bobby Portis (11)	Giannis Antetokounmpo (9)	Fiserv Forum; 17,341	10–8
19	November 24	Detroit	W 114–93	Giannis Antetokounmpo (33)	Bobby Portis (10)	Jrue Holiday (6)	Fiserv Forum; 17,341	11–8
20	November 26	@ Denver	W 120–109	Giannis Antetokounmpo (24)	Giannis Antetokounmpo (13)	Antetokounmpo, Middleton (7)	Ball Arena; 19,520	12–8
21	November 28	@ Indiana	W 118–100	Giannis Antetokounmpo (26)	Giannis Antetokounmpo (13)	Jrue Holiday (9)	Gainbridge Fieldhouse; 13,130	13–8

December: 11–5 (home: 6–1; road: 5–4)

Game	Date	Team	Score	High points	High rebounds	High assists	Location Attendance	Record
22	December 1	Charlotte	W 127–125	Giannis Antetokounmpo (40)	Giannis Antetokounmpo (12)	Giannis Antetokounmpo (9)	Fiserv Forum; 17,341	14–8
23	December 2	@ Toronto	L 93–97	Jrue Holiday (26)	Bobby Portis (11)	Jrue Holiday (8)	Scotiabank Arena; 19,800	14–9
24	December 4	Miami	W 124–102	Pat Connaughton (23)	Bobby Portis (16)	Khris Middleton (9)	Fiserv Forum; 17,341	15–9
25	December 6	Cleveland	W 112–104	Giannis Antetokounmpo (27)	Bobby Portis (16)	Middleton, Holiday (8)	Fiserv Forum; 17,341	16–9
26	December 8	@ Miami	L 104–113	Jrue Holiday (27)	Bobby Portis (8)	Middleton, Holiday, Antetokounmpo (4)	FTX Arena; 19,600	16–10
27	December 10	@ Houston	W 123–114	Giannis Antetokounmpo (41)	Giannis Antetokounmpo (17)	Jrue Holiday (7)	Toyota Center; 16,319	17–10
28	December 12	@ New York	W 112–97	Khris Middleton (24)	Antetokounmpo, Portis (10)	Giannis Antetokounmpo (11)	Madison Square Garden; 19,812	18–10
29	December 13	@ Boston	L 103–117	Antetokounmpo, Holiday (20)	Pat Connaughton (9)	Jrue Holiday (8)	TD Garden; 19,156	18–11
30	December 15	Indiana	W 114–99	Jrue Holiday (26)	Bobby Portis (9)	Jrue Holiday (14)	Fiserv Forum; 17,341	19–11
31	December 17	@ New Orleans	L 112–116	Jrue Holiday (40)	Jordan Nwora (13)	Jrue Holiday (5)	Smoothie King Center; 15,504	19–12
32	December 18	Cleveland	L 90–119	Jordan Nwora (28)	DeMarcus Cousins (12)	Nwora, Smart, Hill (4)	Fiserv Forum; 17,341	19–13
33	December 22	Houston	W 126–106	Jrue Holiday (24)	Jordan Nwora (9)	Jrue Holiday (10)	Fiserv Forum; 17,341	20–13
34	December 23	@ Dallas	W 102–95	Khris Middleton (26)	Connaughton, Cousins, Nwora (8)	Middleton, Holiday (7)	American Airlines Center; 19,654	21–13
35	December 25	Boston	W 117–113	Giannis Antetokounmpo (36)	Giannis Antetokounmpo (12)	Khris Middleton (7)	Fiserv Forum; 17,341	22–13
36	December 28	@ Orlando	W 127–110	Giannis Antetokounmpo (28)	Bobby Portis (7)	Jrue Holiday (10)	Amway Center; 16,696	23–13
37	December 30	@ Orlando	W 136–118	Giannis Antetokounmpo (33)	Giannis Antetokounmpo (12)	Jrue Holiday (7)	Amway Center; 15,855	24–13

January: 7–8 (home: 6–4; road: 1–4)

Game	Date	Team	Score	High points	High rebounds	High assists	Location Attendance	Record
38	January 1	New Orleans	W 136–113	Giannis Antetokounmpo (35)	Giannis Antetokounmpo (16)	Giannis Antetokounmpo (10)	Fiserv Forum; 17,341	25–13
39	January 3	Detroit	L 106–115	Giannis Antetokounmpo (31)	Bobby Portis (14)	Giannis Antetokounmpo (7)	Fiserv Forum; 17,341	25–14
40	January 5	Toronto	L 111–117	Khris Middleton (25)	DeMarcus Cousins (10)	Jrue Holiday (12)	Fiserv Forum; 17,341	25–15
41	January 7	@ Brooklyn	W 121–109	Giannis Antetokounmpo (31)	Bobby Portis (12)	Giannis Antetokounmpo (9)	Barclays Center; 17,732	26–15
42	January 8	@ Charlotte	L 106–114	Giannis Antetokounmpo (43)	Bobby Portis (13)	Khris Middleton (9)	Spectrum Center; 19,139	26–16
43	January 10	@ Charlotte	L 99–103	Khris Middleton (27)	Giannis Antetokounmpo (13)	Khris Middleton (11)	Spectrum Center; 14,253	26–17
44	January 13	Golden State	W 118–99	Giannis Antetokounmpo (30)	Giannis Antetokounmpo (12)	Giannis Antetokounmpo (11)	Fiserv Forum; 17,848	27–17
45	January 15	Toronto	L 96–103	Giannis Antetokounmpo (30)	Bobby Portis (11)	Khris Middleton (5)	Fiserv Forum; 17,341	27–18
46	January 17	@ Atlanta	L 114–121	Khris Middleton (34)	Bobby Portis (13)	Giannis Antetokounmpo (6)	State Farm Arena; 16,903	27–19
47	January 19	Memphis	W 126–114	Giannis Antetokounmpo (33)	Giannis Antetokounmpo (15)	Antetokounmpo, Middleton (7)	Fiserv Forum; 17,341	28–19
48	January 21	Chicago	W 94–90	Giannis Antetokounmpo (30)	Bobby Portis (13)	Khris Middleton (6)	Fiserv Forum; 18,013	29–19
49	January 22	Sacramento	W 133–127	Khris Middleton (34)	Bobby Portis (12)	Khris Middleton (5)	Fiserv Forum; 17,341	30–19
50	January 26	@ Cleveland	L 99–115	Giannis Antetokounmpo (26)	Giannis Antetokounmpo (9)	Jrue Holiday (7)	Rocket Mortgage FieldHouse; 18,904	30–20
51	January 28	New York	W 123–108	Giannis Antetokounmpo (38)	Giannis Antetokounmpo (13)	Jrue Holiday (10)	Fiserv Forum; 17,341	31–20
52	January 30	Denver	L 100–136	Giannis Antetokounmpo (29)	Giannis Antetokounmpo (9)	Jrue Holiday (8)	Fiserv Forum; 17,341	31–21

February: 6–4 (home: 3–3; road: 3–1)

Game	Date	Team	Score	High points	High rebounds	High assists	Location Attendance	Record
53	February 1	Washington	W 112–98	Giannis Antetokounmpo (33)	Giannis Antetokounmpo (15)	Giannis Antetokounmpo (11)	Fiserv Forum; 17,341	32–21
54	February 5	@ Portland	W 137–108	Bobby Portis (30)	Giannis Antetokounmpo (9)	Middleton, Holiday (7)	Moda Center; 19,393	33–21
55	February 6	@ L. A. Clippers	W 137–113	Giannis Antetokounmpo (28)	Bobby Portis (11)	Jrue Holiday (13)	Staples Center; 17,395	34–21
56	February 8	@ L. A. Lakers	W 131–116	Giannis Antetokounmpo (44)	Giannis Antetokounmpo (14)	Jrue Holiday (10)	Staples Center; 18,997	35–21
57	February 10	@ Phoenix	L 107–131	Holiday, Middleton (21)	Bobby Portis (9)	Giannis Antetokounmpo (8)	Footprint Center; 17,071	35–22
58	February 14	Portland	L 107–122	Jrue Holiday (23)	Khris Middleton (11)	Khris Middleton (9)	Fiserv Forum; 17,341	35–23
59	February 15	Indiana	W 128–119	Giannis Antetokounmpo (50)	Antetokounmpo, Portis (14)	Holiday, Middleton (8)	Fiserv Forum; 17,341	36–23
60	February 17	Philadelphia	L 120–123	Giannis Antetokounmpo (32)	Giannis Antetokounmpo (11)	Giannis Antetokounmpo (9)	Fiserv Forum; 17,341	36–24
ASG	February 20	Team LeBron @ Team Durant	W 163–160	Stephen Curry (50)	Giannis Antetokounmpo (12)	Trae Young (10)	Rocket Mortgage FieldHouse; 0	1–0
61	February 26	Brooklyn	L 123–126	Bobby Portis (30)	Giannis Antetokounmpo (14)	Holiday, Middleton (7)	Fiserv Forum; 17,341	36–25
62	February 28	Charlotte	W 130–106	Giannis Antetokounmpo (26)	Giannis Antetokounmpo (16)	Jrue Holiday (8)	Fiserv Forum; 17,341	37–25

March: 11–3 (home: 5–0; road: 6–3)

Game	Date	Team	Score	High points	High rebounds	High assists	Location Attendance	Record
63	March 2	Miami	W 120–119	Giannis Antetokounmpo (28)	Giannis Antetokounmpo (17)	Jrue Holiday (11)	Fiserv Forum; 17,341	38–25
64	March 4	@ Chicago	W 118–112	Giannis Antetokounmpo (34)	Giannis Antetokounmpo (16)	Khris Middleton (7)	United Center; 21,259	39–25
65	March 6	Phoenix	W 132–122	Khris Middleton (44)	Giannis Antetokounmpo (13)	Jrue Holiday (9)	Fiserv Forum; 17,495	40–25
66	March 8	@ Oklahoma City	W 142–115	Giannis Antetokounmpo (39)	Bobby Portis (14)	Khris Middleton (9)	Paycom Center; 15,743	41–25
67	March 9	Atlanta	W 124–115	Giannis Antetokounmpo (43)	Bobby Portis (15)	Holiday, Middleton (8)	Fiserv Forum; 17,341	42–25
68	March 12	@ Golden State	L 109–122	Giannis Antetokounmpo (31)	Giannis Antetokounmpo (8)	Jrue Holiday (7)	Chase Center; 18,064	42–26
69	March 14	@ Utah	W 117–111	Giannis Antetokounmpo (30)	Giannis Antetokounmpo (15)	Jrue Holiday (7)	Vivint Arena; 18,306	43–26
70	March 16	@ Sacramento	W 135–126	Giannis Antetokounmpo (36)	Giannis Antetokounmpo (10)	Khris Middleton (8)	Golden 1 Center; 15,864	44–26
71	March 19	@ Minnesota	L 119–138	Connaughton, Lopez, Middleton (15)	Bobby Portis (10)	Carter, Holiday (7)	Target Center; 17,136	44–27
72	March 22	Chicago	W 126–98	Jrue Holiday (27)	Giannis Antetokounmpo (17)	Jrue Holiday (7)	Fiserv Forum; 17,983	45–27
73	March 24	Washington	W 114–102	Jrue Holiday (24)	Bobby Portis (12)	Jrue Holiday (10)	Fiserv Forum; 18,018	46–27
74	March 26	@ Memphis	L 102–127	Giannis Antetokounmpo (30)	Antetokounmpo, Portis (11)	Khris Middleton (5)	FedExForum; 17,794	46–28
75	March 29	@ Philadelphia	W 118–116	Giannis Antetokounmpo (40)	Giannis Antetokounmpo (14)	Jrue Holiday (10)	Wells Fargo Center; 21,467	47–28
76	March 31	@ Brooklyn	W 120–119	Giannis Antetokounmpo (44)	Giannis Antetokounmpo (14)	Giannis Antetokounmpo (6)	Barclays Center; 17,917	48–28

April: 3–3 (home: 1–2; road: 2–1)

Game	Date	Team	Score	High points	High rebounds	High assists	Location Attendance	Record
77	April 1	L. A. Clippers	L 119–153	Jordan Nwora (28)	Serge Ibaka (10)	Jevon Carter (8)	Fiserv Forum; 18,023	48–29
78	April 3	Dallas	L 112–118	Giannis Antetokounmpo (28)	Giannis Antetokounmpo (10)	Holiday, Middleton (9)	Fiserv Forum; 17,902	48–30
79	April 5	@ Chicago	W 127–106	Brook Lopez (28)	Antetokounmpo, Portis (9)	Jrue Holiday (13)	United Center; 20,799	49–30
80	April 7	Boston	W 127–121	Antetokounmpo, Holiday (29)	Giannis Antetokounmpo (11)	Khris Middleton (9)	Fiserv Forum; 18,046	50–30
81	April 8	@ Detroit	W 131–101	Giannis Antetokounmpo (30)	Bobby Portis (15)	Jrue Holiday (9)	Little Caesars Arena; 22,088	51–30
82	April 10	@ Cleveland	L 115–133	Sandro Mamukelashvili (28)	Sandro Mamukelashvili (13)	Lindell Wigginton (8)	Rocket Mortgage FieldHouse; 19,432	51–31

2021–22 season schedule

=== Playoffs ===
2022 playoff game log
Total: 7–5 (home: 3–3; road: 4–2)
First Round: 4–1 (home: 2–1; road: 2–0)

Game	Date	Team	Score	High points	High rebounds	High assists	Location Attendance	Series
1	April 17	Chicago	W 93–86	Giannis Antetokounmpo (27)	Giannis Antetokounmpo (16)	Holiday, Middleton (6)	Fiserv Forum; 17,717	1–0
2	April 20	Chicago	L 110–114	Giannis Antetokounmpo (33)	Giannis Antetokounmpo (18)	Giannis Antetokounmpo (9)	Fiserv Forum; 17,688	1–1
3	April 22	@ Chicago	W 111–81	Grayson Allen (22)	Bobby Portis (16)	Giannis Antetokounmpo (9)	United Center; 22,667	2–1
4	April 24	@ Chicago	W 119–95	Giannis Antetokounmpo (32)	Giannis Antetokounmpo (17)	Antetokounmpo, Holiday (7)	United Center; 22,020	3–1
5	April 27	Chicago	W 116–100	Giannis Antetokounmpo (33)	Bobby Portis (17)	Jrue Holiday (9)	Fiserv Forum; 17,506	4–1

Conference Semifinals: 3–4 (home: 1–2; road: 2–2)

Game	Date	Team	Score	High points	High rebounds	High assists	Location Attendance	Series
1	May 1	@ Boston	W 101–89	Jrue Holiday (25)	Giannis Antetokounmpo (13)	Giannis Antetokounmpo (12)	TD Garden; 19,156	1–0
2	May 3	@ Boston	L 86–109	Giannis Antetokounmpo (28)	Giannis Antetokounmpo (9)	Antetokounmpo, Holiday (7)	TD Garden; 19,156	1–1
3	May 7	Boston	W 103–101	Giannis Antetokounmpo (42)	Giannis Antetokounmpo (12)	Giannis Antetokounmpo (8)	Fiserv Forum; 17,736	2–1
4	May 9	Boston	L 108–116	Giannis Antetokounmpo (34)	Giannis Antetokounmpo (18)	Jrue Holiday (9)	Fiserv Forum; 17,505	2–2
5	May 11	@ Boston	W 110–107	Giannis Antetokounmpo (40)	Bobby Portis (15)	Jrue Holiday (8)	TD Garden; 19,156	3–2
6	May 13	Boston	L 95–108	Giannis Antetokounmpo (44)	Giannis Antetokounmpo (20)	Giannis Antetokounmpo (6)	Fiserv Forum; 17,681	3–3
7	May 15	@ Boston	L 81–109	Giannis Antetokounmpo (25)	Giannis Antetokounmpo (20)	Giannis Antetokounmpo (9)	TD Garden; 19,156	3–4

2022 playoff schedule

== Player statistics ==
Legend
GP	Games played	GS	Games started	MPG	Minutes per game
FG%	Field-goal percentage	3P%	3-point field-goal percentage	FT%	Free-throw percentage
RPG	Rebounds per game	APG	Assists per game	SPG	Steals per game
BPG	Blocks per game	PPG	Points per game

=== Regular season ===
Milwaukee Bucks statistics
Player	GP	GS	MPG	FG%	3P%	FT%	RPG	APG	SPG	BPG	PPG
Bobby Portis	72	59	28.2	.479	.393	.752	9.1	1.2	.7	.7	14.6
Giannis Antetokounmpo	67	67	32.9	.553	.293	.722	11.6	5.8	1.1	1.4	29.9
Jrue Holiday	67	64	33.0	.501	.411	.761	4.5	6.8	1.6	.4	18.3
Khris Middleton	66	66	32.4	.443	.373	.890	5.4	5.4	1.2	.3	20.1
Grayson Allen	66	61	27.3	.448	.409	.865	3.4	1.5	.7	.3	11.1
Pat Connaughton	65	19	26.0	.458	.395	.833	4.2	1.3	.9	.2	9.9
Jordan Nwora	62	13	19.1	.403	.348	.837	3.6	1.0	.4	.3	7.9
George Hill	54	17	23.2	.429	.306	.919	2.9	2.2	.8	.1	6.2
Wesley Matthews	49	14	20.4	.395	.338	.786	1.9	.7	.5	.2	5.1
Thanasis Antetokounmpo	48	6	9.9	.547	.143	.630	2.1	.5	.3	.3	3.6
Sandro Mamukelashvili	41	3	9.9	.496	.423	.818	2.0	.5	.2	.2	3.8
Rodney Hood^{†}	39	0	14.9	.351	.300	.929	1.7	.8	.3	.1	3.3
Jevon Carter^{†}	20	2	17.7	.506	.558	1.000	2.2	2.5	.5	.2	5.6
Semi Ojeleye^{†}	20	0	15.4	.257	.268	.769	2.9	.3	.3	.3	2.9
Serge Ibaka^{†}	19	2	17.8	.519	.351	.800	5.3	.7	.2	.4	7.0
Lindell Wigginton	19	0	10.5	.426	.346	.543	1.3	1.2	.3	.1	4.2
DeMarcus Cousins^{†}	17	5	16.9	.466	.271	.816	5.8	1.1	.9	.5	9.1
Donte DiVincenzo^{†}	17	0	20.1	.331	.284	.852	3.5	1.7	.6	.2	7.2
Justin Robinson^{†}	17	0	11.6	.316	.270	1.000	.8	1.2	.5	.0	2.8
Brook Lopez	13	11	22.9	.466	.358	.870	4.1	.5	.6	1.2	12.4
Javonte Smart^{†}	13	1	12.3	.256	.222	.833	1.5	1.1	.3	.2	2.4
Georgios Kalaitzakis^{†}	9	0	5.3	.455	.500	.444	.9	.0	.1	.1	1.8
DeAndre' Bembry^{†}	8	0	9.6	.375			1.4	.8	.3	.0	.8
Greg Monroe^{†}	5	0	14.0	.500		.556	4.2	.4	.6	.4	5.4
Langston Galloway^{†}	3	0	16.3	.077	.000		3.3	2.3	.3	.0	.7
Rayjon Tucker^{†}	2	0	21.0	.714	1.000	.667	2.0	3.0	1.5	.0	7.5
Javin DeLaurier	1	0	3.0				1.0	.0	1.0	.0	.0
Jeff Dowtin^{†}	1	0	3.0	.000	.000		.0	.0	.0	.0	.0
Luke Kornet^{†}	1	0	3.0	.000			1.0	.0	.0	.0	.0

=== Playoffs ===
Milwaukee Bucks statistics
Player	GP	GS	MPG	FG%	3P%	FT%	RPG	APG	SPG	BPG	PPG
Jrue Holiday	12	12	38.6	.379	.316	.839	5.6	6.5	1.8	.6	19.1
Giannis Antetokounmpo	12	12	37.3	.491	.220	.679	14.2	6.8	.7	1.3	31.7
Wesley Matthews	12	12	28.8	.391	.400	.667	3.1	1.2	.8	.3	6.2
Brook Lopez	12	12	27.7	.490	.214	.913	5.9	.7	.5	1.5	10.6
Grayson Allen	12	5	25.4	.451	.396	.636	2.9	1.3	.7	.3	8.3
Bobby Portis	12	5	24.8	.417	.298	.773	10.0	.8	.4	.3	10.6
Pat Connaughton	12	0	26.5	.477	.391	1.000	4.3	.9	.4	.3	9.5
Jevon Carter	11	0	11.5	.474	.429	1.000	1.5	.9	.7	.0	2.1
Thanasis Antetokounmpo	8	0	2.5	.667		.333	.5	.1	.1	.0	.6
Jordan Nwora	8	0	2.5	.222	.000	.000	.4	.3	.0	.0	.5
Rayjon Tucker	8	0	2.4	.333	.000		.4	.0	.0	.0	.3
Luca Vildoza	7	0	2.4	.333	.200		.3	.6	.3	.0	.7
Serge Ibaka	6	0	3.7	.250	.000	.500	1.7	.0	.0	.0	1.5
George Hill	5	0	15.2	.200	.500	1.000	1.2	.6	.0	.0	1.0
Khris Middleton	2	2	36.0	.417	.429	1.000	5.0	7.0	1.5	.0	14.5

- ^{†} Denotes player spent time with another team in the season. Stats reflect time with the Bucks only.

== Transactions ==
=== Trades ===
July 30, 2021	To Milwaukee Bucks Draft rights to Sandro Mamukelashvili (No. 54); Draft rights to Georgios Kalaitzakis (No. 60); 2024 second-round pick 2026 second-round pick	To Indiana Pacers Draft rights to Isaiah Todd (No. 31)
August 7, 2021	To Milwaukee Bucks Grayson Allen	To Memphis Grizzlies Sam Merrill; 2024 second-round pick 2026 second-round pick

=== Free agency ===
==== Re-signed ====
Player	Signed
Bobby Portis	August 6
Thanasis Antetokounmpo	August 14

==== Additions ====
Player	Signed	Former Team
George Hill	August 6	Philadelphia 76ers
Rodney Hood	August 6	Toronto Raptors
Semi Ojeleye	August 6	Boston Celtics
Justin Robinson	September 15	Oklahoma City Thunder
Javin DeLaurier	September 27	(Canada) Niagara River Lions
Tremont Waters	September 27	Boston Celtics
Elijah Bryant	September 29	Milwaukee Bucks
Johnny O'Bryant	September 29	(Turkey) Türk Telekom B.K.

==== Subtractions ====
Player	Left	New Team
Jeff Teague (Note: Not re-signed by the Bucks, and subsequently became a free agent.)	August 6	—N/a
Axel Toupane	August 6	—N/a
P. J. Tucker	August 7	Miami Heat
Bryn Forbes	August 25	San Antonio Spurs
Mamadi Diakite	September 26	Oklahoma City Thunder
Elijah Bryant	September 26	Milwaukee Bucks
Justin Jackson	October 16	Dallas Mavericks
