= 2021–22 Los Angeles Lakers season =

American professional basketball season

- Head coach: Frank Vogel
- President: Jeanie Buss
- General manager: Rob Pelinka
- Owners: Jerry Buss family trust (majority); Jeanie Buss (controlling owner); Mark Walter, Todd Boehly, Edward P. Roski, and Patrick Soon-Shiong (minority)
- Arena: Crypto.com Arena (Note: On December 25, 2021, the Lakers' home arena changed its name from Staples Center to Crypto.com Arena.)

Results
- Record: 33–49 (.402)
- Place: Division: 4th (Pacific); Conference: 11th (Western)
- Playoff finish: Did not qualify
- Stats at Basketball Reference

Local media
- Television: Spectrum SportsNet
- Radio: ESPN LA 710 (English); 1020 Radio AM (Spanish)

The 2021–22 Los Angeles Lakers season was the 75th season of the franchise, its 74th season in the National Basketball Association (NBA), its 62nd season in Los Angeles, and its 23rd season playing home games at Crypto.com Arena. The team was coached by Frank Vogel. The Lakers competed as a member of the Western Conference's Pacific Division, finishing the season with a 33–49 record.

The Lakers, who had acquired veteran All-Stars Russell Westbrook and Carmelo Anthony during the offseason, were widely considered by experts as favorites to win the Western Conference. Despite LeBron James' strong individual performance, the Lakers fared poorly and were eliminated from both playoff and play-in contention on April 5, 2022. The team's failure to secure playoff berth was widely regarded as one of the biggest disappointments in franchise history. Following the conclusion of the season, head coach Frank Vogel was fired.

== Previous season ==
The Lakers concluded the 2020–21 season with a 42–30 record, finishing with the third seed in the Pacific Division and the seventh seed in the Western Conference, which was not enough for a direct playoff spot. In the NBA play-in tournament, they defeated the Golden State Warriors to earn them the seventh seed in the 2021 NBA playoffs. The Lakers lost to the Phoenix Suns in the first round in six games despite being up 2–1, making it the first time that LeBron James lost in the first round of the playoffs. Anthony Davis suffered a strained left groin in Game 4, and he was also sidelined in Game 5, when the Suns took a 3–2 lead. He returned in Game 6, but played only five minutes after reaggravating the injury. The Lakers were eliminated 4–2.

== Offseason ==
In June 2021, longtime minority owner and team landlord Philip Anschutz sold his 27% stake in the team to Los Angeles Dodgers co-owners Mark Walter and Todd Boehly for an estimated $1.35 billion. The NBA approved the sale that July. Shortly before the sale, the team extended its Crypto.com Arena lease with Anschutz Entertainment Group until 2041, and upgrades to the arena worth "nine figures" were promised.

In August 2021, the Lakers traded for Russell Westbrook in a trade that also sent two future 2nd round draft picks (2024 and 2028) to the Lakers and Montrezl Harrell, Kyle Kuzma, Kentavious Caldwell-Pope, and the 22nd pick of the 2021 NBA draft to the Washington Wizards. This trade formed a new superteam of LeBron James, Anthony Davis, and Westbrook in the Western Conference. In 2022, Claire de Lune of The Guardian described the Westbrook trade as a "'disaster'". In 2023, Andy Bailey of Bleacher Report named the Lakers' acquisition of Westbrook as the worst trade in the NBA over the past five years.

=== Draft ===
Round	Pick	Player	Position	Nationality	School / club team
1	22	Isaiah Jackson	C/PF	United States	Kentucky (Fr.)

== Preseason ==
=== Game log ===
2021 preseason game log
Total: 0–6 (Home: 0–3; Road: 0–3)
Preseason: 0–6 (home: 0–3; road: 0–3)

Game	Date	Team	Score	High points	High rebounds	High assists	Location Attendance	Record
1	October 3	Brooklyn	L 97–123	Malik Monk (15)	Kendrick Nunn (7)	Bazemore, Horton-Tucker (3)	Staples Center; 16,000	0–1
2	October 6	@ Phoenix	L 105–117	Malik Monk (18)	Anthony Davis (8)	Rajon Rondo (5)	Footprint Center; 12,434	0–2
3	October 8	@ Golden State	L 114–121	Dwight Howard (23)	Dwight Howard (12)	Rajon Rondo (6)	Chase Center; 18,064	0–3
4	October 10	Phoenix	L 94–123	Anthony Davis (19)	DeAndre Jordan (5)	Anthony Davis (6)	Staples Center; 13,844	0–4
5	October 12	Golden State	L 99–111	Anthony Davis (20)	Russell Westbrook (10)	Russell Westbrook (6)	Staples Center; 11,526	0–5
6	October 14	@ Sacramento	L 112–116	LeBron James (30)	Anthony Davis (12)	Austin Reaves (7)	Golden 1 Center; Attendance not reported	0–6

2021–22 season schedule

== Regular season ==
The regular season was the 75th season of the franchise, its 74th season in the National Basketball Association (NBA), its 62nd season in Los Angeles, and its 23rd season playing home games at Crypto.com Arena. The team was coached by Frank Vogel in his third and final year as Lakers head coach. They competed as a member of the Western Conference's Pacific Division, finishing the season 11th with a 33–49 record, one game behind the last spot for the NBA play-in tournament. It was the team's worst record since 2016–17, slightly better than the Lakers' worst five seasons.

After the acquisitions of Russell Westbrook and Carmelo Anthony in the offseason, the Lakers were widely considered by experts to be the favorites to win the Western Conference. The team remained stable with a .500 percentage for the last direct playoff access spot until January 7, and remained within play-in contention until March 30. Despite LeBron James' best points per game average since 2005–06, and a number of scoring and age-related records, the Lakers disappointed, with a combination of injuries and underperformances. Following the season, Sam Quinn of CBS News stated that an aged and mismanaged roster was also responsible for the disappointing outcome.

On April 5, the Lakers were eliminated from both playoff and play-in contention for the first time since 2018–19 and the seventh time in nine years after a 121–110 loss to the Phoenix Suns. It was the fourth time in James' career that he missed the NBA playoffs and the second time in his four years with the Lakers. It was also the third time and first since 2015 that Westbrook missed the playoffs when he played for the Oklahoma City Thunder, having previously only missed the playoffs in his debut in 2009. The Lakers' failure to make the play-in/playoffs was widely regarded to be one of the biggest disappointments in franchise history, if not one of the greatest underachievements in NBA history. James, Davis, Westbrook, and Anthony were selected to the NBA 75th Anniversary Team, the Lakers being the team with the most active players.

James was the only Laker to make the All-Star cut, with Anthony Davis having a second consecutive injury-laden season. Due to injuries, the Lakers used 41 different starting lineups, and the trio of James, Davis, and Westbrook played only 21 games together, compiling an 11–10 record; the Lakers were just 20–33 when only two of the three were playing together. Due to an ankle injury in March, James fell out of a close three-player race for the NBA scoring title, finishing with only 56 games played, two less than necessary to qualify.

Following the season, head coach Frank Vogel was fired on April 11, 2022. Vogel had led the team to an NBA championship in 2020 and to a first-round loss in the 2021 NBA playoffs. His overall record with the team was 127–98.

=== Standings ===
==== Division ====
Pacific Division	W	L	PCT	GB	Home	Road	Div	GP
z – Phoenix Suns	64	18	.780	–	32‍–‍9	32‍–‍9	10–6	82
x – Golden State Warriors	53	29	.646	11.0	31‍–‍10	22‍–‍19	12–4	82
pi – Los Angeles Clippers	42	40	.512	22.0	25‍–‍16	17‍–‍24	9–7	82
Los Angeles Lakers	33	49	.402	31.0	21‍–‍20	12‍–‍29	3–13	82
Sacramento Kings	30	52	.366	34.0	16‍–‍25	14‍–‍27	6–10	82

==== Conference ====
Western Conference
#	Team	W	L	PCT	GB	GP
1	z – Phoenix Suns *	64	18	.780	–	82
2	y – Memphis Grizzlies *	56	26	.683	8.0	82
3	x – Golden State Warriors	53	29	.646	11.0	82
4	x – Dallas Mavericks	52	30	.634	12.0	82
5	y – Utah Jazz *	49	33	.598	15.0	82
6	x – Denver Nuggets	48	34	.585	16.0	82
7	x – Minnesota Timberwolves	46	36	.561	18.0	82
8	pi – Los Angeles Clippers	42	40	.512	22.0	82
9	x – New Orleans Pelicans	36	46	.439	28.0	82
10	pi − San Antonio Spurs	34	48	.415	30.0	82
11	Los Angeles Lakers	33	49	.402	31.0	82
12	Sacramento Kings	30	52	.366	34.0	82
13	Portland Trail Blazers	27	55	.329	37.0	82
14	Oklahoma City Thunder	24	58	.293	40.0	82
15	Houston Rockets	20	62	.244	44.0	82

=== Game log ===
2021–22 game log
Total: 33–49 (Home: 21–20; Road: 12–29)
October: 4–3 (home: 3–2; road: 1–1)

Game	Date	Team	Score	High points	High rebounds	High assists	Location Attendance	Record
1	October 19	Golden State	L 114–121	LeBron James (34)	Davis, James (11)	James, Rondo (5)	Staples Center; 18,997	0–1
2	October 22	Phoenix	L 105–115	LeBron James (25)	Anthony Davis (14)	Russell Westbrook (9)	Staples Center; 18,997	0–2
3	October 24	Memphis	W 121–118	Carmelo Anthony (28)	Davis, Jordan (8)	Russell Westbrook (13)	Staples Center; 18,997	1–2
4	October 26	@ San Antonio	W 125–121 (OT)	Anthony Davis (35)	Anthony Davis (17)	Russell Westbrook (8)	AT&T Center; 18,354	2–2
5	October 27	@ Oklahoma City	L 115–123	Anthony Davis (30)	Russell Westbrook (14)	Russell Westbrook (13)	Paycom Center; 15,783	2–3
6	October 29	Cleveland	W 113–101	LeBron James (26)	Anthony Davis (9)	LeBron James (8)	Staples Center; 18,997	3–3
7	October 31	Houston	W 95–85	Carmelo Anthony (23)	Anthony Davis (13)	LeBron James (8)	Staples Center; 16,448	4–3

November: 8–8 (home: 5–4; road: 3–4)

Game	Date	Team	Score	High points	High rebounds	High assists	Location Attendance	Record
8	November 2	Houston	W 119–117	LeBron James (30)	Davis, Westbrook (9)	LeBron James (10)	Staples Center; 18,997	5–3
9	November 4	Oklahoma City	L 104–107	Anthony Davis (29)	Anthony Davis (18)	Davis, Westbrook (5)	Staples Center; 18,997	5–4
10	November 6	@ Portland	L 90–105	Malik Monk (13)	Jordan, Westbrook (9)	Russell Westbrook (6)	Moda Center; 19,393	5–5
11	November 8	Charlotte	W 126–123 (OT)	Anthony Davis (32)	Davis, Westbrook (14)	Russell Westbrook (12)	Staples Center; 18,997	6–5
12	November 10	Miami	W 120–117 (OT)	Malik Monk (27)	Anthony Davis (13)	Russell Westbrook (14)	Staples Center; 18,997	7–5
13	November 12	Minnesota	L 83–107	Anthony Davis (22)	Dwight Howard (10)	Rajon Rondo (8)	Staples Center; 18,997	7–6
14	November 14	San Antonio	W 114–106	Anthony Davis (34)	Anthony Davis (15)	Rondo, Westbrook (7)	Staples Center; 18,997	8–6
15	November 15	Chicago	L 103–121	Talen Horton-Tucker (28)	Horton-Tucker, Westbrook, Davis, Howard (6)	Russell Westbrook (8)	Staples Center; 18,997	8–7
16	November 17	@ Milwaukee	L 102–109	Talen Horton-Tucker (25)	Talen Horton-Tucker (12)	Russell Westbrook (15)	Fiserv Forum; 17,341	8–8
17	November 19	@ Boston	L 108–130	Anthony Davis (31)	Davis, James (6)	Russell Westbrook (6)	TD Garden; 19,156	8–9
18	November 21	@ Detroit	W 121–116	Anthony Davis (30)	Anthony Davis (10)	Russell Westbrook (10)	Little Caesars Arena; 15,532	9–9
19	November 23	@ New York	L 100–106	Russell Westbrook (31)	Russell Westbrook (13)	Russell Westbrook (10)	Madison Square Garden; 19,812	9–10
20	November 24	@ Indiana	W 124–116 (OT)	LeBron James (39)	DeAndre Jordan (11)	LeBron James (6)	Gainbridge Fieldhouse; 15,572	10–10
21	November 26	Sacramento	L 137–141 (3OT)	LeBron James (30)	Russell Westbrook (10)	James, Westbrook (10)	Staples Center; 18,997	10–11
22	November 28	Detroit	W 110–106	LeBron James (33)	Anthony Davis (10)	James, Westbrook (9)	Staples Center; 18,997	11–11
23	November 30	@ Sacramento	W 117–92	Anthony Davis (25)	Dwight Howard (13)	Russell Westbrook (6)	Golden 1 Center; 12,459	12–11

December: 6–8 (home: 3–4; road: 3–4)

Game	Date	Team	Score	High points	High rebounds	High assists	Location Attendance	Record
24	December 3	L.A. Clippers	L 115–119	Anthony Davis (27)	LeBron James (11)	Russell Westbrook (9)	Staples Center; 18,997	12–12
25	December 7	Boston	W 117–102	LeBron James (30)	Anthony Davis (16)	Russell Westbrook (11)	Staples Center; 18,997	13–12
26	December 9	@ Memphis	L 95–108	Anthony Davis (22)	LeBron James (10)	LeBron James (11)	FedExForum; 16,334	13–13
27	December 10	@ Oklahoma City	W 116–95	LeBron James (33)	Russell Westbrook (9)	Russell Westbrook (7)	Paycom Center; 16,523	14–13
28	December 12	Orlando	W 106–94	LeBron James (30)	LeBron James (11)	LeBron James (10)	Staples Center; 18,997	15–13
29	December 15	@ Dallas	W 107–104 (OT)	LeBron James (24)	Anthony Davis (12)	Russell Westbrook (9)	American Airlines Center; 20,270	16–13
30	December 17	@ Minnesota	L 92–110	Isaiah Thomas (19)	LeBron James (10)	Rajon Rondo (8)	Target Center; 17,136	16–14
31	December 19	@ Chicago	L 110–115	LeBron James (31)	LeBron James (14)	Russell Westbrook (8)	United Center; 20,917	16–15
32	December 21	Phoenix	L 90–108	LeBron James (34)	Russell Westbrook (10)	Russell Westbrook (5)	Staples Center; 18,997	16–16
33	December 23	San Antonio	L 110–138	LeBron James (36)	Howard, James (9)	LeBron James (6)	Staples Center; 18,997	16–17
34	December 25	Brooklyn	L 115–122	LeBron James (39)	Russell Westbrook (12)	Russell Westbrook (11)	Crypto.com Arena; 18,997	16–18
35	December 28	@ Houston	W 132–123	LeBron James (32)	Russell Westbrook (12)	LeBron James (11)	Toyota Center; 18,104	17–18
36	December 29	@ Memphis	L 99–104	LeBron James (37)	LeBron James (13)	Russell Westbrook (12)	FedExForum; 17,794	17–19
37	December 31	Portland	W 139–106	LeBron James (43)	LeBron James (14)	Russell Westbrook (12)	Crypto.com Arena; 18,997	18–19

January: 6–8 (home: 4–2; road: 2–6)

Game	Date	Team	Score	High points	High rebounds	High assists	Location Attendance	Record
38	January 2	Minnesota	W 108–103	LeBron James (26)	LeBron James (7)	James, Westbrook (5)	Crypto.com Arena; 18,343	19–19
39	January 4	Sacramento	W 122–114	LeBron James (31)	Dwight Howard (14)	Talen Horton-Tucker (6)	Crypto.com Arena; 17,919	20–19
40	January 7	Atlanta	W 134–118	LeBron James (32)	Russell Westbrook (11)	Russell Westbrook (13)	Crypto.com Arena; 18,997	21–19
41	January 9	Memphis	L 119–127	LeBron James (35)	LeBron James (9)	LeBron James (7)	Crypto.com Arena; 18,288	21–20
42	January 12	@ Sacramento	L 116–125	LeBron James (34)	Russell Westbrook (12)	James, Westbrook (6)	Golden 1 Center; 12,199	21–21
43	January 15	@ Denver	L 96–133	LeBron James (25)	LeBron James (9)	Malik Monk (6)	Ball Arena; 19,520	21–22
44	January 17	Utah	W 101–95	LeBron James (25)	Howard, Westbrook (8)	LeBron James (7)	Crypto.com Arena; 17,238	22–22
45	January 19	Indiana	L 104–111	LeBron James (30)	LeBron James (12)	Talen Horton-Tucker (6)	Crypto.com Arena; 17,818	22–23
46	January 21	@ Orlando	W 116–105	LeBron James (29)	Russell Westbrook (11)	Russell Westbrook (7)	Amway Center; 18,846	23–23
47	January 23	@ Miami	L 107–113	LeBron James (33)	LeBron James (11)	Russell Westbrook (9)	FTX Arena; 19,973	23–24
48	January 25	@ Brooklyn	W 106–96	LeBron James (33)	LeBron James (7)	James, Reaves (6)	Barclays Center; 18,126	24–24
49	January 27	@ Philadelphia	L 87–105	Anthony Davis (31)	Anthony Davis (12)	Malik Monk (5)	Wells Fargo Center; 20,953	24–25
50	January 28	@ Charlotte	L 114–117	Russell Westbrook (35)	Austin Reaves (8)	Anthony, Westbrook (5)	Spectrum Center; 19,469	24–26
51	January 30	@ Atlanta	L 121–129	Malik Monk (33)	Malik Monk (10)	Russell Westbrook (12)	State Farm Arena; 17,391	24–27

February: 3–6 (home: 3–3; road: 0–3)

Game	Date	Team	Score	High points	High rebounds	High assists	Location Attendance	Record
52	February 2	Portland	W 99–94	Anthony Davis (30)	Anthony Davis (15)	Russell Westbrook (13)	Crypto.com Arena; 17,259	25–27
53	February 3	@ L.A. Clippers	L 110–111	Anthony Davis (30)	Anthony Davis (17)	Malik Monk (7)	Crypto.com Arena; 19,068	25–28
54	February 5	New York	W 122–115 (OT)	James, Monk (29)	Anthony Davis (17)	LeBron James (10)	Crypto.com Arena; 18,997	26–28
55	February 8	Milwaukee	L 116–131	LeBron James (27)	Russell Westbrook (10)	LeBron James (8)	Crypto.com Arena; 18,997	26–29
56	February 9	@ Portland	L 105–107	LeBron James (30)	Davis, James (7)	Horton-Tucker, James (7)	Moda Center; 19,393	26–30
57	February 12	@ Golden State	L 115–117	LeBron James (26)	LeBron James (15)	LeBron James (8)	Chase Center; 18,064	26–31
58	February 16	Utah	W 106–101	LeBron James (33)	LeBron James (8)	James, Westbrook (6)	Crypto.com Arena; 17,787	27–31
59	February 25	L.A. Clippers	L 102–105	LeBron James (21)	Dwight Howard (16)	Malik Monk (6)	Crypto.com Arena; 18,997	27–32
60	February 27	New Orleans	L 95–123	LeBron James (32)	Dwight Howard (11)	LeBron James (3)	Crypto.com Arena; 17,536	27–33

March: 4–12 (home: 2–3; road: 2–9)

Game	Date	Team	Score	High points	High rebounds	High assists	Location Attendance	Record
61	March 1	Dallas	L 104–109	LeBron James (26)	LeBron James (12)	Russell Westbrook (8)	Crypto.com Arena; 17,857	27–34
62	March 3	@ L.A. Clippers	L 111–132	LeBron James (26)	James, Westbrook (8)	D. J. Augustin (6)	Crypto.com Arena (LAC); 19,068	27–35
63	March 5	Golden State	W 124–116	LeBron James (56)	LeBron James (10)	Malik Monk (5)	Crypto.com Arena; 18,997	28–35
64	March 7	@ San Antonio	L 110–117	Talen Horton-Tucker (18)	Russell Westbrook (10)	Russell Westbrook (6)	AT&T Center; 18,354	28–36
65	March 9	@ Houston	L 130–139 (OT)	Russell Westbrook (30)	LeBron James (14)	LeBron James (12)	Toyota Center; 18,055	28–37
66	March 11	Washington	W 122–109	LeBron James (50)	LeBron James (7)	Russell Westbrook (9)	Crypto.com Arena; 18,997	29–37
67	March 13	@ Phoenix	L 111–140	LeBron James (31)	LeBron James (7)	LeBron James (6)	Footprint Center; 17,071	29–38
68	March 14	Toronto	L 103–114	LeBron James (30)	Gabriel, James (9)	Talen Horton-Tucker (5)	Crypto.com Arena; 18,228	29–39
69	March 16	@ Minnesota	L 104–124	LeBron James (19)	Dwight Howard (6)	Malik Monk (6)	Target Center; 17,136	29–40
70	March 18	@ Toronto	W 128–123 (OT)	LeBron James (36)	Russell Westbrook (10)	Russell Westbrook (10)	Scotiabank Arena; 19,800	30–40
71	March 19	@ Washington	L 119–127	LeBron James (38)	James, Westbrook (10)	Russell Westbrook (8)	Capital One Arena; 20,476	30–41
72	March 21	@ Cleveland	W 131–120	LeBron James (38)	LeBron James (11)	LeBron James (12)	Rocket Mortgage FieldHouse; 19,432	31–41
73	March 23	Philadelphia	L 121–126	Howard, Westbrook (24)	Gabriel, Westbrook (9)	Johnson, Westbrook (8)	Crypto.com Arena; 18,997	31–42
74	March 27	@ New Orleans	L 108–116	LeBron James (39)	Dwight Howard (10)	Monk, Reaves, Westbrook (6)	Smoothie King Center; 18,516	31–43
75	March 29	@ Dallas	L 110–128	Malik Monk (28)	Russell Westbrook (8)	Russell Westbrook (6)	American Airlines Center; 20,382	31–44
76	March 31	@ Utah	L 109–122	Russell Westbrook (24)	Dwight Howard (12)	Russell Westbrook (7)	Vivint Arena; 18,306	31–45

April: 2–4 (home: 1–2; road: 1–2)

Game	Date	Team	Score	High points	High rebounds	High assists	Location Attendance	Record
77	April 1	New Orleans	L 111–114	LeBron James (38)	Anthony Davis (12)	Malik Monk (7)	Crypto.com Arena; 18,997	31–46
78	April 3	Denver	L 118–129	Anthony Davis (28)	Russell Westbrook (10)	Anthony Davis (8)	Crypto.com Arena; 16,273	31–47
79	April 5	@ Phoenix	L 110–121	Russell Westbrook (28)	Anthony Davis (13)	Austin Reaves (6)	Footprint Center; 17,071	31–48
80	April 7	@ Golden State	L 112–128	Talen Horton-Tucker (40)	Dwight Howard (12)	Malik Monk (4)	Chase Center; 18,064	31–49
81	April 8	Oklahoma City	W 120–101	Stanley Johnson (21)	Horton-Tucker, Howard, Johnson (8)	Horton-Tucker, Monk (5)	Crypto.com Arena; 18,997	32–49
82	April 10	@ Denver	W 146–141 (OT)	Malik Monk (41)	Austin Reaves (16)	Austin Reaves (10)	Ball Arena; 19,520	33–49

2021–22 season schedule

== Player stats ==
Legend
GP	Games played	GS	Games started	MPG	Minutes per game
FG%	Field-goal percentage	3P%	3-point field-goal percentage	FT%	Free-throw percentage
RPG	Rebounds per game	APG	Assists per game	SPG	Steals per game
BPG	Blocks per game	PPG	Points per game

=== Regular season statistics ===
Player	GP	GS	MPG	FG%	3P%	FT%	RPG	APG	SPG	BPG	PPG
LeBron James	56	56	37.2	.524	.359	.756	8.2	6.2	1.3	1.1	30.3
Anthony Davis	40	40	35.1	.532	.186	.713	9.9	3.1	1.2	2.3	23.2
Russell Westbrook	78	78	34.3	.444	.298	.667	7.4	7.1	1.0	0.3	18.5
Malik Monk	76	37	28.1	.473	.391	.795	3.4	2.9	.8	.4	13.8
Carmelo Anthony	69	3	26.0	.441	.375	.830	4.2	1.0	.7	0.8	13.3
Talen Horton-Tucker	60	19	25.2	.416	.269	.800	3.2	2.7	1.0	0.5	10.0
Isaiah Thomas	21	1	25.3	.308	.227	.727	2.0	1.5	0.0	0.5	9.3
Austin Reaves	61	19	23.2	.459	.317	.839	3.2	1.8	0.5	0.3	7.3
Sekou Doumbouya	2	0	8.0	.625	.500	.750	3.0	0.0	1.5	1.0	7.0
Mason Jones	4	0	12.8	.467	.250	.800	2.5	1.0	0.1	0.0	6.8
Wenyen Gabriel*	19	5	16.4	.505	.261	.650	4.3	0.6	0.0	0.3	6.7
Wayne Ellington	43	9	18.8	.413	.389	.818	1.8	0.7	0.5	0.7	6.7
Stanley Johnson	48	27	22.8	.466	.314	.716	3.2	1.7	0.9	0.3	6.7
Avery Bradley	62	45	22.7	.423	.390	.889	2.2	0.8	0.9	0.1	6.4
Dwight Howard	60	27	16.2	.612	.533	.658	5.9	0.6	0.6	0.6	6.2
Mac McClung*	1	0	22.0	.400	.333	1.000	3.0	1.0	1.0	1.0	6.0
D. J. Augustin*	21	0	17.8	.452	.426	1.000	1.3	0.1	0.1	0.3	5.3
DeAndre Jordan*	32	19	12.8	.674	.000	.462	5.4	0.4	0.3	0.8	4.1
Trevor Ariza	24	11	19.3	.333	.270	.556	3.4	1.1	0.5	0.3	4.0
Kent Bazemore	39	14	14.0	.324	.363	.765	1.8	0.9	0.6	0.2	3.4
Rajon Rondo*	18	0	16.1	.324	.267	.500	2.3	3.7	0.7	0.3	3.1
Jemerrio Jones	2	0	7.5	.667	.000	.000	1.3	0.1	0.1	0.3	2.0
Darren Collison	3	0	12.3	.286	.000	.000	1.3	0.1	0.1	0.3	1.3
Chaundee Brown Jr.*	2	0	10.5	.143	.000	.000	1.3	0.1	0.0	0.5	1.0
Jay Huff	4	0	5.0	.000	.000	.000	1.0	0.3	0.3	0.3	0.0

*Total with the Lakers only

== Roster ==
2021–22 Los Angeles Lakers roster
Players

Pos.	No.	Player	Height	Weight	DOB	From
F	7	Carmelo Anthony	6 ft 7 in (2.01 m)	238 lb (108 kg)	1984-05-29	Syracuse
G	4	D. J. Augustin	5 ft 11 in (1.80 m)	183 lb (83 kg)	1987-11-10	Texas
F	9	Kent Bazemore	6 ft 4 in (1.93 m)	195 lb (88 kg)	1989-07-01	Old Dominion
G	20	Avery Bradley	6 ft 3 in (1.91 m)	180 lb (82 kg)	1990-11-26	Texas
F/C	3	Anthony Davis	6 ft 10 in (2.08 m)	253 lb (115 kg)	1993-03-11	Kentucky
G	2	Wayne Ellington	6 ft 4 in (1.93 m)	207 lb (94 kg)	1987-11-29	North Carolina
F	35	Wenyen Gabriel	6 ft 9 in (2.06 m)	205 lb (93 kg)	1997-03-26	Kentucky
G	5	Talen Horton-Tucker	6 ft 4 in (1.93 m)	234 lb (106 kg)	2000-11-25	Iowa State
F/C	39	Dwight Howard	6 ft 10 in (2.08 m)	265 lb (120 kg)	1985-12-08	Southwest Atlanta Christian Academy
F	6	LeBron James	6 ft 9 in (2.06 m)	250 lb (113 kg)	1984-12-30	St. Vincent-St. Mary HS (OH)
F	14	Stanley Johnson	6 ft 6 in (1.98 m)	242 lb (110 kg)	1996-05-29	Arizona
G	40	Mason Jones (TW)	6 ft 4 in (1.93 m)	200 lb (91 kg)	1998-07-21	Arkansas
G	37	Mac McClung (TW)	6 ft 2 in (1.88 m)	185 lb (84 kg)	1999-01-06	Texas Tech
G	11	Malik Monk	6 ft 3 in (1.91 m)	200 lb (91 kg)	1998-02-04	Kentucky
G	12	Kendrick Nunn (injured)	6 ft 2 in (1.88 m)	190 lb (86 kg)	1995-08-03	Oakland
G	15	Austin Reaves	6 ft 5 in (1.96 m)	197 lb (89 kg)	1998-05-29	Oklahoma
G	0	Russell Westbrook	6 ft 3 in (1.91 m)	200 lb (91 kg)	1988-11-12	UCLA

Coaches
Head coach
- Frank Vogel
Assistant(s)
- Quinton Crawford
- David Fizdale
- Phil Handy
- John Lucas III
- Mike Penberthy
- Miles Simon
- Ed Streit (strength and conditioning)
- Roger Sancho (trainer)

Legend
- (DP) Unsigned draft pick
- (FA) Free agent
- (S) Suspended
- (GL) On assignment to G League affiliate
- (TW) Two-way affiliate player
- (L) On leave from the team
- Injured

Roster
Updated: April 7, 2022

== Transactions ==
=== Overview ===
Players added

Via trade

- Russell Westbrook

Via free agency

- Carmelo Anthony
- Trevor Ariza
- Kent Bazemore
- Wayne Ellington
- Dwight Howard
- DeAndre Jordan
- Malik Monk
- Kendrick Nunn
- Rajon Rondo
Players lost

Via free agency

- Alex Caruso
- Andre Drummond
- Devontae Cacok
- Ben McLemore
- Markieff Morris
- Dennis Schröder

Via trade

- Kentavious Caldwell-Pope
- Marc Gasol
- Montrezl Harrell
- Isaiah Jackson
- Kyle Kuzma

Waived

- Alfonzo McKinnie

=== Trades ===
August 6, 2021
August 6, 2021	Five-team trade
August 6, 2021	To Brooklyn Nets 2024 second-round pick (from Washington); 2025 second-round pick swap right (from Washington); Draft rights to Nikola Milutinov (2015 No. 26) (from San Antonio)	To Indiana Pacers Draft rights to Isaiah Jackson (No. 22) (from Los Angeles)
August 6, 2021	To Los Angeles Lakers Russell Westbrook; 2023 CHI second-round pick (from Washington); 2024 second-round pick (from Washington); 2028 WAS second-round pick (from Washington)	To San Antonio Spurs Chandler Hutchison; 2022 second-round pick (from Washington)
August 6, 2021	To Washington Wizards Kyle Kuzma; Kentavious Caldwell-Pope; Montrezl Harrell; Aaron Holiday; Spencer Dinwiddie; Draft rights to Isaiah Todd (No. 31); Cash considerations
September 10, 2021	To Los Angeles Lakers Draft rights to Wang Zhelin (2016, No. 57)	To Memphis Grizzlies Marc Gasol; 2024 second-round pick Cash considerations
January 3, 2022	Three-team trade
January 3, 2022	To Cleveland Cavaliers Rajon Rondo (from Los Angeles)	To Los Angeles Lakers Draft rights to Louis Labeyrie (2014 No. 57) (from New York)
January 3, 2022	To New York Knicks Denzel Valentine (from Cleveland); Draft rights to Brad Newley (2007 No. 54) (from Los Angeles); Draft rights to Wang Zhelin (2016 No. 57) (from Los Angeles)

=== Free agency ===
==== Re-signed ====
Date	Player	Contract terms	Ref.
August 6	Talen Horton-Tucker	3 year, $32 million deal	

==== Additions ====
Date	Player	Contract terms	Former team	Ref.
August 3	Joël Ayayi	Two-way contract	Gonzaga	
August 3	Austin Reaves	Two-way contract	Oklahoma	
August 6	Carmelo Anthony	1 year, $2.6 million deal	Portland Trail Blazers	
August 6	Trevor Ariza	1 year, $2.6 million deal	Miami Heat	
August 6	Kent Bazemore	1 year, $2.4 million deal	Golden State Warriors	
August 6	Wayne Ellington	1 year, $2.6 million deal	Detroit Pistons	
August 6	Dwight Howard	1 year, $2.6 million deal	Philadelphia 76ers	
August 6	Malik Monk	1 year, $1.7 million deal	Charlotte Hornets	
August 6	Kendrick Nunn	2 year, $10 million deal	Miami Heat	
August 10	Chaundee Brown	Exhibit 10 contract	Michigan	
August 10	Mac McClung	Exhibit 10 contract	Texas Tech	
August 31	Rajon Rondo	1 year, $2.6 million contract	Memphis Grizzlies	
September 9	DeAndre Jordan	1 year, $2.6 million contract	Detroit Pistons	
October 18	Jay Huff	Two-way contract	Virginia	
October 18	Avery Bradley	1 year, $2.6 million contract	Golden State Warriors	

==== Subtractions ====
Date	Player	Reason	New team	Ref.
August 4	Andre Drummond	1 year, $2.4 million deal	Philadelphia 76ers	
August 4	Alfonzo McKinnie	Waived	Chicago Bulls	
August 5	Ben McLemore	1 year, $2.4 million deal	Portland Trail Blazers	
August 6	Markieff Morris	1 year, $2.6 million deal	Miami Heat	
August 10	Alex Caruso	4 year, $37 million deal	Chicago Bulls	
August 13	Dennis Schröder	1 year, $5.9 million deal	Boston Celtics	
September 20	Devontae Cacok	Training Camp contract	Brooklyn Nets	
