= Bobby Portis =

American basketball player (born 1995)

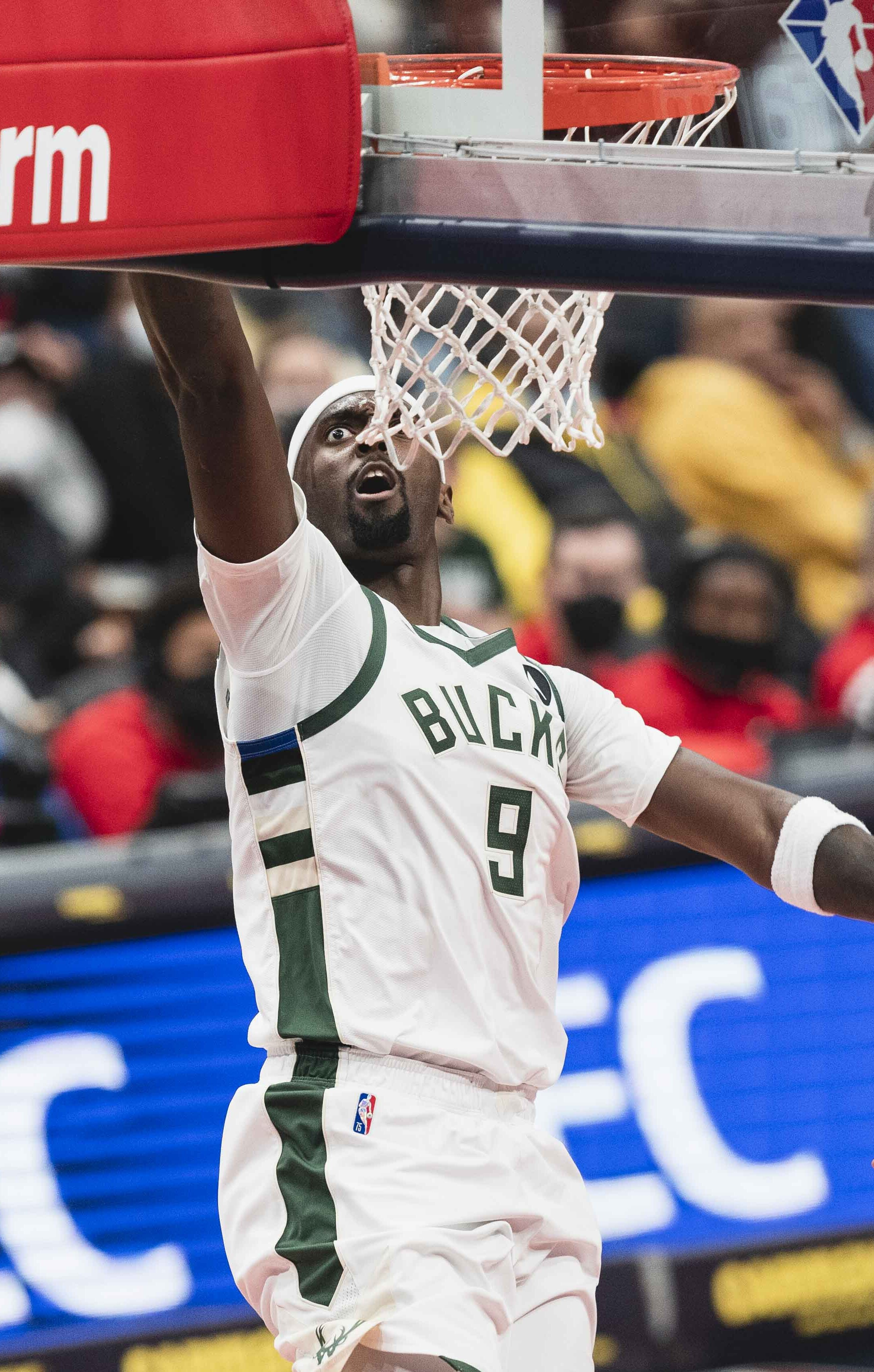
- Portis with the Milwaukee Bucks in 2021

No. 95 – Miami Heat
- Position: Power forward
- League: NBA

Personal information
- Born: February 10, 1995 (age 31) Little Rock, Arkansas, U.S.
- Listed height: 6 ft 9 in (2.06 m)
- Listed weight: 250 lb (113 kg)

Career information
- High school: Hall (Little Rock, Arkansas)
- College: Arkansas (2013–2015)
- NBA draft: 2015: 1st round, 22nd overall pick
- Drafted by: Chicago Bulls
- Playing career: 2015–present

Career history
- 2015–2019: Chicago Bulls
- 2017: →Windy City Bulls
- 2019: Washington Wizards
- 2019–2020: New York Knicks
- 2020–2026: Milwaukee Bucks
- 2026–present: Miami Heat

Career highlights
- NBA champion (2021); NBA Cup champion (2024); Consensus second-team All-American (2015); SEC Player of the Year (2015); First-team All-SEC (2015); Second-team All-SEC (2014); SEC All-Freshman team (2014); McDonald's All-American (2013); First-team Parade All-American (2013); Arkansas Mr. Basketball (2013)
- Stats at NBA.com
- Stats at Basketball Reference

Bobby Portis Jr. (born February 10, 1995) is an American professional basketball player for the Miami Heat of the National Basketball Association (NBA). He played college basketball for the Arkansas Razorbacks, earning consensus second-team All-American honors as a sophomore in 2015. Portis was selected in the first round of the 2015 NBA draft by the Chicago Bulls with the 22nd overall pick. He won an NBA championship with the Milwaukee Bucks in 2021. Portis was traded alongside Giannis Antetokounmpo in a blockbuster deal in 2026.

== High school career ==
Portis played high school basketball at Hall High School in Little Rock. He was a highly decorated prep player there, earning McDonald's and Parade All-American status and was named Mr. Basketball of Arkansas in 2013. Upon committing to Arkansas, Portis became the first in-state McDonald's All-American to sign with the Razorbacks since Corliss Williamson in 1992 and was considered a key recruit for coach Mike Anderson's rebuild of the program.

== College career ==
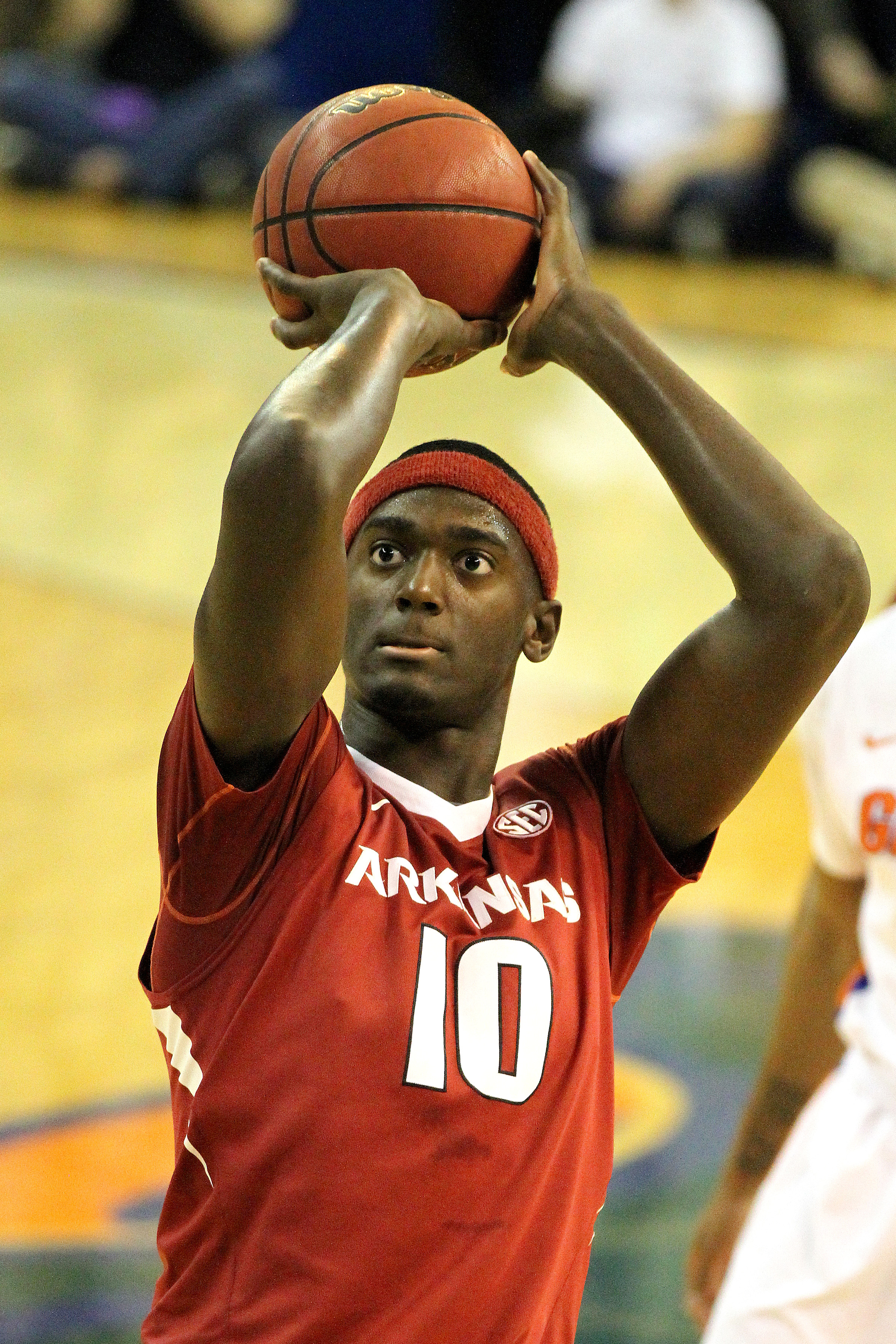
Portis at Arkansas

As a freshman at Arkansas, Portis averaged 12.3 points, 6.8 rebounds and 1.6 blocks per game. He was named to the Southeastern Conference All-Freshman team and second-team All-SEC.

In his sophomore season, Portis was named to the preseason All-SEC team and led the Razorbacks to a top 25 ranking. During his second and final season, Portis averaged 17.5 points, 8.9 rebounds, 1.4 blocks, 1.2 assists, and 1.1 steals per game. He was named one of 20 finalists for the John R. Wooden Award for national college player of the year, one of only two players from the SEC.

On March 10, 2015, Portis was selected as the SEC Player of the Year by the league's coaches. This marks the first time an Arkansas Razorback was selected since Corliss Williamson won the award back-to-back during the 1993–94 and 1994–95 seasons. By that time he was considered one of the top players in college basketball in the 2014–15 season and a likely first-round pick in the 2015 NBA draft.

== Professional career ==
=== Chicago Bulls (2015–2019) ===
On June 25, 2015, Portis was selected with the 22nd overall pick in the 2015 NBA draft by the Chicago Bulls. He signed his rookie scale contract with the Bulls on July 7, 2015. In his NBA debut on November 3, 2015, he scored 10 points in the Bulls' 25-point loss to the Charlotte Hornets. Following a quadruple overtime loss to the Detroit Pistons on December 18, 2015, a number of the Bulls' starting five members were fatigued heading into the team's December 19, 2015, game against the New York Knicks. With Jimmy Butler and Tony Snell struggling, Portis capitalized and had the best night of his young career with 20 points and 11 rebounds.

On October 28, 2016, the Bulls exercised their third-year team option on Portis' rookie scale contract, extending the contract through the 2017–18 season. On January 6, 2017, Portis was assigned to the Windy City Bulls, Chicago's D-League affiliate. He was recalled the next day. On February 16, 2017, he had a season-high 19 points in a 104–103 win over the Boston Celtics. On March 2, 2017, he had 17 points and a season-high 13 rebounds in a 94–87 win over the Golden State Warriors. On March 18, 2017, he scored a career-high 22 points in a 95–86 win over the Utah Jazz.

On October 17, 2017, Portis and teammate Nikola Mirotić were engaged in a physical altercation during practice, in which Mirotić charged at Portis, who punched Mirotić in the face, which led to him going to the hospital for a concussion and multiple face fractures. A day later, Portis was suspended by the Bulls for eight games. In his season debut on November 7, Portis had 21 points and 13 rebounds in a 119–114 loss to the Toronto Raptors. On December 11, he scored a career-high 23 points in a 108–85 win over the Boston Celtics. Four days later, he set a new career high with 27 points to go with 12 rebounds in a 115–109 win over the Milwaukee Bucks. On February 22, 2018, he set a new career high with 38 points in a 116–115 loss to the Philadelphia 76ers. On March 17, 2018, he recorded 15 points and a season-high 15 rebounds in a 114–109 loss to the Cleveland Cavaliers.

In the Bulls' season opener on October 18, 2018, Portis had 20 points and 11 rebounds in a 127–108 loss to the Philadelphia 76ers. On October 25, he was ruled out for four-to-six weeks with a moderate sprain of the MCL of his right knee. On December 10, after sitting out nearly seven weeks, Portis returned to the lineup and had nine points in 19 minutes in a 108–89 loss to the Sacramento Kings. On December 20, he was ruled out for two to four weeks with a right ankle sprain, an injury suffered the previous night against the Brooklyn Nets. He returned to action on January 6 against the Nets after missing seven games. On January 30, he scored 22 of his 26 points in the second half of the Bulls' 105–89 win over the Miami Heat.

=== Washington Wizards (2019) ===
On February 6, 2019, Portis was traded, along with Jabari Parker and a 2023 second-round pick, to the Washington Wizards in exchange for Otto Porter. He made his debut for the Wizards two days later, scoring a game-high 30 points off the bench in a 119–106 win over the Cleveland Cavaliers.

=== New York Knicks (2019–2020) ===
On July 9, 2019, Portis signed a one-year, $15 million contract with the New York Knicks. Portis became a free agent when the Knicks decided not to exercise the team option on November 19, 2020.

=== Milwaukee Bucks (2020–2026) ===
On November 26, 2020, Portis signed a two-year, $7.4 million contract with the Milwaukee Bucks. On April 29, 2021, Portis scored 10 points, grabbed 11 rebounds, and recorded a career-high 4 steals in a 143–136 overtime loss to the Houston Rockets. Portis finished the regular season with the third highest three-point percentage in the NBA at 47.1%, behind Joe Harris (47.5%) and Marcus Morris Sr. (47.3%).

During the 2021 NBA playoffs, in Game 3 of the Eastern Conference Finals on June 27, 2021, facing the Atlanta Hawks, Portis played an important role for the Bucks scoring 15 points, grabbing 4 rebounds, and adding 2 steals in a 113–102 road win. On July 1, 2021, Portis had his first career playoff start against Atlanta in the Eastern Conference Finals in place of an injured Giannis Antetokounmpo. Portis finished with 22 points, 8 rebounds, 3 assists, and 3 steals in 36 minutes in a victory with the crowd frequently chanting "Bobby". After defeating the Hawks 4–2, the Bucks won the 2021 NBA Finals 4–2 over the Phoenix Suns, with Portis scoring 16 points in the deciding Game 6.

On August 6, 2021, Portis re-signed with the Bucks. The contract was worth $9 million over two years and contained a player option for the second year. On November 24, 2021, Portis scored 28 points and grabbed 10 rebounds in a 114–93 victory over the Detroit Pistons. On December 10, 2021, Portis scored 21 points, grabbed 7 rebounds, and blocked 3 shots in a 123–114 victory against the Rockets. Later that month, Portis missed 4 games while in the NBA's COVID-19 protocols. On February 5, 2022, Portis made six three-pointers and scored a season-high 30 points, in a 137–108 win over the Portland Trail Blazers. During the first round of the 2022 NBA Playoffs, on April 22, Portis helped the Bucks to a 111–81 Game 3 win over the Chicago Bulls with 18 points and 16 rebounds.

On June 29, 2022, Portis exercised the second-year player option on his existing contract, becoming an unrestricted free agent. One day later, Portis announced he had re-signed with the Bucks on a four-year contract worth $49 million. This contract was finalized at the beginning of the NBA's free-agency period on July 6. On December 3, 2022, Portis scored a game-leading 20 points, grabbed 8 rebounds, and recorded a season-high 7 assists during a 105–96 win over the Charlotte Hornets. On January 25, 2023, it was announced Portis suffered MCL and ankle injuries during a win over the Detroit Pistons, and would be out for at least two weeks. On March 9, Portis scored a season-high 28 points and grabbed 13 rebounds in a 118–113 win over the Brooklyn Nets. On April 10, Portis took home his first NBA Player of the Week honor in his career. In the final week of the regular season, Portis averaged 20.7 points and 12.3 rebounds. On April 20, Portis finished third in voting for the NBA Sixth Man of the Year.

On December 16, 2023, Portis scored 31 points, his highest point total during his Bucks tenure, during a 146–114 win over the Detroit Pistons. On March 17, 2024, Portis scored 31 points, grabbed 10 rebounds, and recorded three steals during a 140–119 win over the Phoenix Suns.

On February 20, 2025, Portis was suspended for 25 games for testing positive for the banned substance Tramadol. On April 8, in his first game back from the suspension, Portis played a key part in a come-from-behind win over the Minnesota Timberwolves, in which Milwaukee had trailed by 24 points in the 4th quarter, scoring 18 points and grabbing 10 rebounds. He made 49 total appearance (seven starts) for Milwaukee during the 2024–25 NBA season, averaging 13.9 points, 8.4 rebounds, and 2.1 assists. On April 22, during the first round of the playoffs, Portis had a double-double of 28 points and 12 rebounds in a 123–115 Game 2 loss to the Indiana Pacers.

On June 29, 2025, Portis re-signed with the Bucks on a three-year, $44 million contract.

On February 8, 2026, Portis was selected for the State Farm 3-Point Contest, his first time competing in an event at NBA All-Star Weekend.

=== Miami Heat (2026–present) ===
On July 6, 2026, Portis, alongside Giannis Antetokounmpo, was traded to the Miami Heat in exchange for Tyler Herro, Kel'el Ware, Jaime Jaquez Jr., Kasparas Jakučionis, the rights to Nate Ament and four more future draft picks. On October 21, Portis made his Heat debut, recording seven points and four rebounds in a 131–106 loss to the Minnesota Timberwolves.

== National team career ==
Portis was a member of the United States national team that competed in the 2023 FIBA Basketball World Cup as a reserve. They finished fourth in that tournament.

== Career statistics ==
Legend
GP	Games played	GS	Games started	MPG	Minutes per game
FG%	Field goal percentage	3P%	3-point field goal percentage	FT%	Free throw percentage
RPG	Rebounds per game	APG	Assists per game	SPG	Steals per game
BPG	Blocks per game	PPG	Points per game	**Bold**	Career high
†	Won an NBA championship

=== NBA ===
==== Regular season ====
Year	Team	GP	GS	MPG	FG%	3P%	FT%	RPG	APG	SPG	BPG	PPG
2015–16	Chicago	62	4	17.8	.427	.308	.727	5.4	.8	.4	.4	7.0
2016–17	Chicago	64	13	15.6	.488	.333	.661	4.6	.5	.3	.2	6.8
2017–18	Chicago	73	4	22.5	.471	.359	.769	6.8	1.7	.7	.3	13.2
2018–19	Chicago	22	6	24.1	.450	.375	.780	7.3	1.3	.5	.4	14.1
2018–19	Washington	28	22	27.4	.440	.403	.809	8.6	1.5	**.9**	.4	14.3
2019–20	New York	66	5	21.1	.450	.358	.763	5.1	1.5	.5	.3	10.1
2020–21†	Milwaukee	66	7	20.8	**.523**	**.471**	.740	7.1	1.1	.8	.4	11.4
2021–22	Milwaukee	72	**59**	**28.2**	.479	.393	.752	9.1	1.2	.7	**.7**	**14.6**
2022–23	Milwaukee	70	22	26.0	.496	.370	.768	**9.6**	1.5	.4	.2	14.1
2023–24	Milwaukee	**82**	4	24.5	.508	.407	.790	7.3	1.3	.8	.4	13.8
2024–25	Milwaukee	49	7	25.4	.466	.365	**.836**	8.4	**2.1**	.7	.5	13.9
2025–26	Milwaukee	67	9	24.2	.488	.456	.706	6.4	1.6	.6	.2	13.7
Career		721	162	22.9	.479	.393	.761	7.1	1.3	.6	.4	12.1

==== Playoffs ====
Year	Team	GP	GS	MPG	FG%	3P%	FT%	RPG	APG	SPG	BPG	PPG
2017	Chicago	6	0	20.1	**.515**	**.462**	—	6.0	**1.2**	.5	**.5**	6.7
2021†	Milwaukee	**20**	2	18.3	.464	.346	.720	5.0	.6	**.7**	.4	8.8
2022	Milwaukee	12	5	24.8	.417	.298	.773	10.0	.8	.4	.3	10.6
2023	Milwaukee	5	2	21.5	.488	.278	**1.000**	8.2	**1.2**	.6	.4	9.6
2024	Milwaukee	6	**6**	**31.1**	.484	.250	.615	**11.3**	1.0	.5	.2	**16.5**
2025	Milwaukee	5	1	31.6	.441	.357	.000	8.2	1.4	.4	.4	14.0
Career		54	16	22.9	.459	.329	.719	7.5	.9	.6	.3	10.4

=== College ===
Year	Team	GP	GS	MPG	FG%	3P%	FT%	RPG	APG	SPG	BPG	PPG
2013–14	Arkansas	34	34	27.0	.509	.273	**.737**	6.8	**1.5**	1.0	**1.6**	12.3
2014–15	Arkansas	**36**	**36**	**29.9**	**.536**	**.467**	**.737**	**8.9**	1.2	**1.1**	1.4	**17.5**
Career		70	70	28.5	.526	.365	.737	7.9	1.3	1.1	1.5	15.0

== Personal life ==
Portis has said, "I talked to God a lot since I was a young child. I followed the path that He lays, and He has blessed me tremendously and helped me get here. I feel like anything that I ask from Him, He gives it to me in some way."

Portis' foundation, the Bobby Portis Foundation, is a charitable organization that creates programs and initiatives for single mothers in Arkansas.

In October 2022, Portis launched a campaign alongside the Wisconsin Department of Transportation and Milwaukee mayor Cavalier Johnson that aims to lower reckless driving and speeding in Wisconsin.

On November 4, 2024, Portis' house was burglarized while he was playing in a game against the Cleveland Cavaliers, one of a series of thefts targeting prominent athletes. Nearly $1.5 million worth of designer bags, jewelry, and cash was stolen, along with his 2021 championship ring. In February 2025 seven men were arrested and charged with the burglaries.

== See also ==
- List of people banned or suspended by the NBA
