= Cam Thomas =

American basketball player (born 2001)

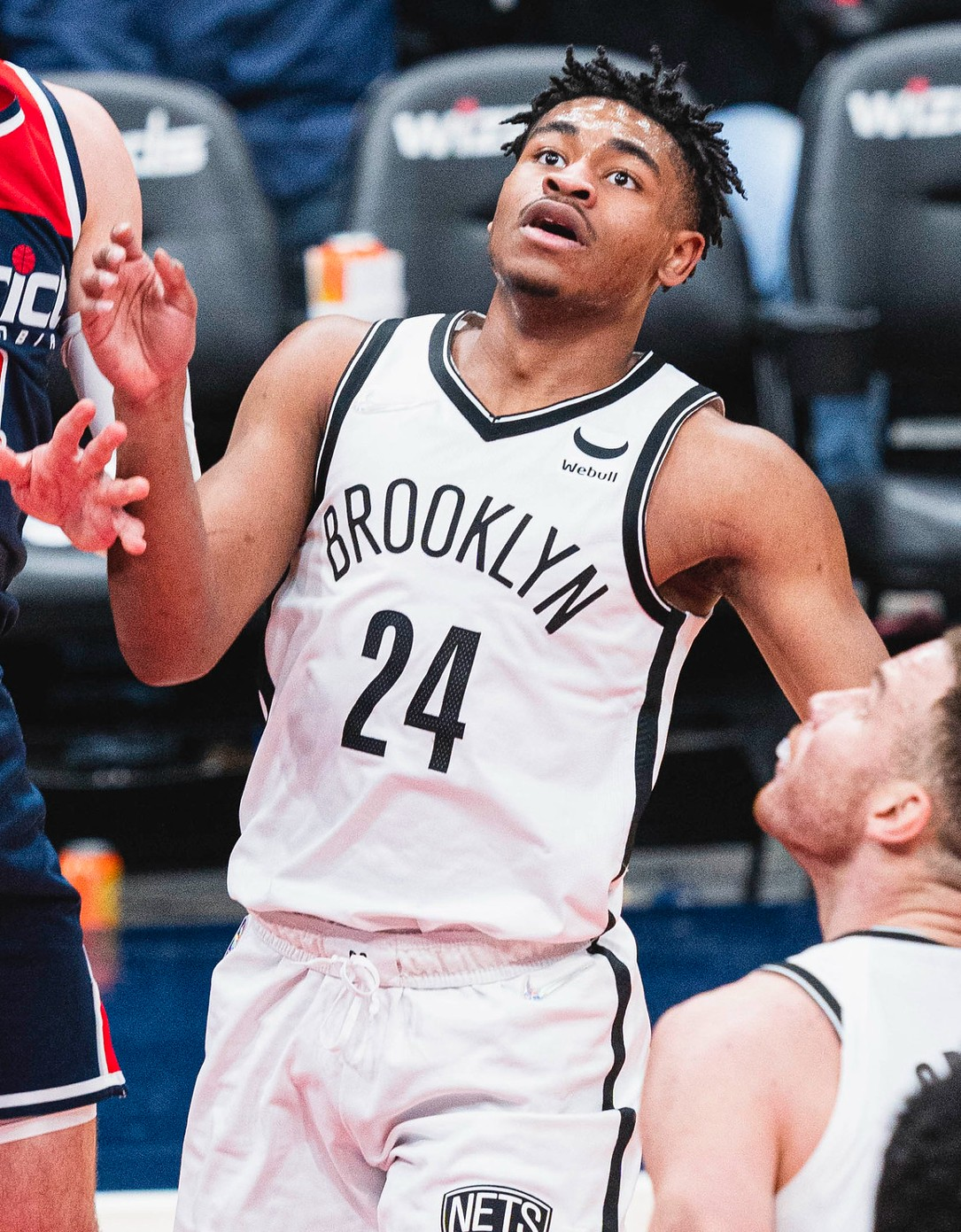
- Thomas with the Brooklyn Nets in 2021

Free agent
- Position: Shooting guard

Personal information
- Born: October 13, 2001 (age 25) Yokosuka, Japan
- Listed height: 6 ft 3 in (1.91 m)
- Listed weight: 210 lb (95 kg)

Career information
- High school: Oscar F. Smith (Chesapeake, Virginia); Oak Hill Academy (Mouth of Wilson, Virginia)
- College: LSU (2020–2021)
- NBA draft: 2021: 1st round, 27th overall pick
- Drafted by: Brooklyn Nets
- Playing career: 2021–present

Career history
- 2021–2026: Brooklyn Nets
- 2021: →Long Island Nets
- 2026: Milwaukee Bucks

Career highlights
- First-team All-SEC (2021); SEC All-Freshman Team (2021)
- Stats at NBA.com
- Stats at Basketball Reference

Cameron Bouchea Thomas (born October 13, 2001) is an American professional basketball player who last played for the Milwaukee Bucks of the National Basketball Association (NBA). He was a consensus five-star recruit and one of the best shooting guards in the 2020 class. He is the youngest player in NBA history to score 40+ points in three straight games. He played college basketball for the LSU Tigers.

== Early life ==
Thomas was born in Yokosuka, Kanagawa Prefecture, Japan while his mother was living there. When he was seven, he won a contest by making 33 free throws in a row.

As a freshman, Thomas began playing basketball for Oscar F. Smith High School in Chesapeake, Virginia. He did not play in his sophomore season because he and his mother "weren't on the same page" as the team's coaching staff. For his junior season, he transferred to Oak Hill Academy in Mouth of Wilson, Virginia, where he joined Cole Anthony and Kofi Cockburn in one of the most touted teams in the country. Thomas averaged a team-high 26.2 points, 3.8 rebounds and 3.4 assists per game, leading his team to a 31–5 record. In July 2019, he was named Offensive Player of the Year at the Nike Elite Youth Basketball League after averaging a league-best 29.5 points per game for Boo Williams. As a senior at Oak Hill, Thomas averaged 31.5 points, six rebounds and 3.4 assists per game. Thomas posted 30-plus points in nine games, including two 40-point performances. He led his team to the Tournament of Champions title, where he was named most valuable player. Thomas was selected to play in the Jordan Brand Classic.

=== Recruiting ===
On November 18, 2019, Thomas committed to play college basketball at Louisiana State University (LSU). He chose the Tigers over an offer from UCLA, among others, after taking official visits to both schools.

College recruiting
Name	Hometown	School	Height	Weight	Commit date
Cameron Thomas; SG	Chesapeake, VA	Oak Hill Academy (VA)	6 ft 3 in (1.91 m)	180 lb (82 kg)	Nov 18, 2019
Cameron Thomas; SG	Recruit ratings: Rivals: 247Sports: ESPN: (93)				
Overall recruit ranking: Rivals: 27 247Sports: 25 ESPN: 23
Note: In many cases, Scout, Rivals, 247Sports, On3, and ESPN may conflict in their listings of height and weight.; In these cases, the average was taken. ESPN grades are on a 100-point scale.; Sources: "LSU 2020 Basketball Commitments". Rivals.; "2020 LSU Tigers Recruiting Class". ESPN.; "2020 Team Ranking". Rivals.

== College career ==
In Thomas's college debut on November 26, 2020, he scored 27 points in a 94–81 win against SIU Edwardsville. Thomas led all freshman in scoring with 23 points per game, while also averaging 3.4 rebounds and 1.4 assists per game. He was named to the First Team All-SEC. On April 15, 2021, he declared for the 2021 NBA draft, forgoing his remaining college eligibility.

== Professional career ==
=== Brooklyn Nets (2021–2026) ===
==== 2021–22 season ====
Thomas was selected with the 27th pick in the 2021 NBA draft by the Brooklyn Nets. Thomas was later included in the roster of the Nets to play in 2021 NBA Summer League. On August 5, 2021, Thomas signed with the Brooklyn Nets. Thomas was named NBA Summer League MVP with Davion Mitchell averaging 27 points per game and was the Summer League leading scorer, and was named to the Summer League First Team. On October 19, Thomas made his debut in the NBA, coming off the bench to score two points in a 104–127 loss to the Milwaukee Bucks. On November 20, while on assignment with the Long Island Nets, he scored 46 points in a 114–110 win over the Raptors 905.

==== 2022–23 season ====
Thomas joined the Nets' 2022 NBA Summer League roster. On July 18, 2022, Thomas was named to the All-NBA Summer League First Team. On December 10, Thomas scored a then-career-high 33 points in a 136–133 win over the Indiana Pacers.

On February 4, 2023, Thomas put up a then career-high 44 points in a 125–123 win over the Washington Wizards. The next game, Thomas scored a new career-high 47 points in a 124–116 loss to the Los Angeles Clippers. He became the second youngest player in NBA history to score at least 40 points in consecutive games, behind LeBron James. On February 7, 2023, Thomas put up 43 points in a 116–112 loss to the Phoenix Suns. With this game, Thomas became the youngest player in NBA history to score at least 40 points in three consecutive games. On February 10, 2023, he was fined $40,000 by the NBA for saying "no homo", which was perceived as anti-gay, during a post-game interview following a game the night before against the Chicago Bulls.

==== 2023–24 season ====
On October 25, 2023, Thomas put up 36 points off the bench in a 114–113 loss to the Cleveland Cavaliers. His 36 points were the most off the bench in a season-opener in NBA history. On November 6, Thomas scored a season-high 45 points during a 129–125 loss to the Milwaukee Bucks. On December 16, Thomas put up 41 points in a 124–120 loss to the Golden State Warriors. He also surpassed Bernard King's record for the most 40-point games in Nets history at age 22 years old or younger with his sixth career 40-point game.

==== 2024–25 season ====
Thomas made 25 appearances (23 starts) for Brooklyn during the 2024–25 NBA season, averaging 24.0 points, 3.3 rebounds, and 3.8 assists. On March 15, 2025, Thomas was ruled out for the remainder of the season due to a left hamstring strain.

==== 2025–26 season ====
On September 4, 2025, Thomas signed a one-year, $6 million qualifying offer deal to return to the Nets after a summer spent in restricted free agency. He made 24 appearances (eight starts) for Brooklyn during the 2025–26 NBA season, averaging 15.6 points, 1.8 rebounds, and 3.1 assists. On February 5, 2026, Thomas was waived by the Nets following the acquisition of Josh Minott.

=== Milwaukee Bucks (2026) ===
On February 8, 2026, Thomas signed with the Milwaukee Bucks. On February 9, against the Orlando Magic, Thomas made his debut, tallying up four points, one rebound, and one assist in 13 minutes of gameplay. On February 11, Thomas came off the bench, tallying 34 points, four rebounds, and two assists over 25 minutes in a 116–108 victory over the Magic. Thomas tied the record of scoring the most points by a Bucks reserve in a regular season game since Jordan Nwora in 2021. On March 23, the Bucks waived Thomas.

== Career statistics ==
Legend
GP	Games played	GS	Games started	MPG	Minutes per game
FG%	Field goal percentage	3P%	3-point field goal percentage	FT%	Free throw percentage
RPG	Rebounds per game	APG	Assists per game	SPG	Steals per game
BPG	Blocks per game	PPG	Points per game	**Bold**	Career high

=== NBA ===
==== Regular season ====
Year	Team	GP	GS	MPG	FG%	3P%	FT%	RPG	APG	SPG	BPG	PPG
2021–22	Brooklyn	**67**	2	17.6	.433	.270	.829	2.4	1.2	.5	.1	8.5
2022–23	Brooklyn	57	4	16.6	.441	**.383**	.868	1.7	1.4	.4	.1	10.6
2023–24	Brooklyn	66	**51**	**31.4**	**.442**	.364	.856	3.2	2.9	**.7**	**.2**	22.5
2024–25	Brooklyn	25	23	31.2	.438	.349	**.881**	**3.3**	**3.8**	.6	.1	**24.0**
2025–26	Brooklyn	24	8	24.3	.399	.325	.843	1.8	3.1	.2	.1	15.6
2025–26	Milwaukee	18	0	16.6	.431	.275	.754	1.6	1.9	.3	.1	10.7
Career		257	88	22.8	.435	.340	.851	2.4	2.1	.5	.1	14.9

==== Playoffs ====
Year	Team	GP	GS	MPG	FG%	3P%	FT%	RPG	APG	SPG	BPG	PPG
2022	Brooklyn	1	0	.4	—	—	—	.0	.0	.0	.0	.0
2023	Brooklyn	**2**	0	**7.8**	.429	.000	—	**.5**	**.5**	.0	.0	**3.0**
Career		3	0	5.3	.429	.000	—	.3	.3	.0	.0	2.0

=== College ===
Year	Team	GP	GS	MPG	FG%	3P%	FT%	RPG	APG	SPG	BPG	PPG
2020–21	LSU	29	29	34.0	.406	.325	.882	3.4	1.4	.9	.2	23.0
