= Kessler Edwards =

American basketball player (born 2000)

- Edwards with Virtus Bologna in 2026

No. 9 – Virtus Bologna
- Position: Small forward / power forward
- League: LBA; EuroLeague

Personal information
- Born: August 9, 2000 (age 26) Glendale, California, U.S.
- Listed height: 6 ft 7 in (2.01 m)
- Listed weight: 203 lb (92 kg)

Career information
- High school: Etiwanda (Rancho Cucamonga, California)
- College: Pepperdine (2018–2021)
- NBA draft: 2021: 2nd round, 44th overall pick
- Drafted by: Brooklyn Nets
- Playing career: 2021–present

Career history
- 2021–2023: Brooklyn Nets
- 2021–2023: →Long Island Nets
- 2023–2024: Sacramento Kings
- 2024: →Stockton Kings
- 2024–2025: Dallas Mavericks
- 2024–2025: →Texas Legends
- 2025–2026: Grand Rapids Gold
- 2026: Hapoel Tel Aviv
- 2026–present: Virtus Bologna

Career highlights
- CBI champion (2021); First-team All-WCC (2021); Second-team All-WCC (2020); WCC All-Freshman Team (2019)
- Stats at NBA.com
- Stats at Basketball Reference

Kessler Donovan Edwards (born August 9, 2000) is an American professional basketball player for Virtus Bologna of the Italian Lega Basket Serie A (LBA) and the EuroLeague. He played college basketball for the Pepperdine Waves.

== High school career ==
Edwards played basketball for Etiwanda High School in Rancho Cucamonga, California. As a junior, he averaged 17 points and nine rebounds per game, earning First Team All-Baseline League honors. Edwards averaged 21.3 points and 7.3 rebounds per game as a senior and was named Baseline League MVP. He competed for Prodigy Elite on the Amateur Athletic Union circuit. A consensus three-star recruit, he committed to playing college basketball for Pepperdine.

== College career ==
As a freshman at Pepperdine, Edwards averaged 10 points and 5.6 rebounds per game. He was a WCC All-Freshman Team selection. As a sophomore, Edwards averaged 13.8 points and a team-leading 7.5 rebounds per game. He was named to the Second Team All-WCC. On January 21, 2021, he recorded a career-high 37 points and 11 rebounds in an 85–68 win over Pacific. He led Pepperdine to the College Basketball Invitational title and was named MVP. As a junior, Edwards averaged 17.2 points and 6.8 rebounds per game, earning First Team All-WCC recognition. On April 23, 2021, he declared for the 2021 NBA draft while maintaining his college eligibility. He later signed with BDA and WME Sports, forgoing his remaining eligibility.

== Professional career ==
=== Brooklyn Nets (2021–2023) ===
Edwards was selected in the second round of the 2021 NBA draft with the 44th pick by the Brooklyn Nets, and was later included in the roster of the Nets for the 2021 NBA Summer League. On August 16, he signed a two-way contract with the Nets. Under the terms of the deal, he split time between Brooklyn and their NBA G League affiliate, the Long Island Nets. On April 10, 2022, Edwards' deal was promoted to a standard contract. While with the nets he saw much playing name with all have 21 minutes a game over 42 games In those games, Edwards averaged 5.9 points, 3.6 rebounds, and 0.6 assists.

On July 6, 2022, Edwards re-signed with the Nets to a reported two-year contract. He made 14 appearances (including one start) for Brooklyn during his sophomore campaign, recording averages of 1.1 points, 1.0 rebound, and 0.1 assists.

=== Sacramento Kings (2023–2024) ===
On February 8, 2023, Edwards and cash considerations were traded to the Sacramento Kings in exchange for the draft rights to David Michineau. He made 22 appearances (including three starts) over the remainder of the year, averaging 3.9 points, 2.1 rebounds, and 1.0 assists.

Edwards made 54 appearances for Sacramento during the 2023–24 NBA season, recording averages of 1.7 points, 0.8 rebounds, and 0.3 assists.

=== Dallas Mavericks (2024–2025) ===
On August 27, 2024, Edwards signed a two-way contract with the Dallas Mavericks. Edwards made 40 appearances (including 18 starts) for Dallas during the 2024–25 season, averaging 4.2 points, 2.9 rebounds, and 1.1 assists.

=== Grand Rapids Gold (2025–2026) ===
On August 12, 2025, Edwards signed a one-year contract with the Denver Nuggets. He was waived by the Nuggets prior to the start of the regular season on October 18. He was then assigned to the Nuggets' G League affiliate, the Grand Rapids Gold.

=== Hapoel Tel Aviv (2026) ===
On February 19, 2026, Edwards signed with Hapoel Tel Aviv of the Israeli Premier League and the EuroLeague. In 13 appearances for Tel Aviv, he recorded averages of 3.8 points, 3.4 rebounds, and 0.5 assists. On June 7, Edwards parted ways with the club.

=== Virtus Bologna (2026–present) ===
On July 10, 2026, Edwards signed with Virtus Bologna of the Italian Lega Basket Serie A (LBA) and the EuroLeague.

== Career statistics ==
Legend
GP	Games played	GS	Games started	MPG	Minutes per game
FG%	Field goal percentage	3P%	3-point field goal percentage	FT%	Free throw percentage
RPG	Rebounds per game	APG	Assists per game	SPG	Steals per game
BPG	Blocks per game	PPG	Points per game	**Bold**	Career high

=== NBA ===
==== Regular season ====
Year	Team	GP	GS	MPG	FG%	3P%	FT%	RPG	APG	SPG	BPG	PPG
2021–22	Brooklyn	48	**23**	**20.6**	.412	.353	.842	**3.6**	.6	**.6**	**.5**	**5.9**
2022–23	Brooklyn	14	1	5.7	.250	.167	.500	1.0	.1	.2	.1	1.1
2022–23	Sacramento	22	3	13.9	.435	.349	.769	2.1	1.0	.5	.2	3.9
2023–24	Sacramento	**54**	0	5.1	.415	.385	.556	.8	.3	.2	.1	1.7
2024–25	Dallas	40	18	15.2	**.496**	**.407**	**.923**	2.9	**1.1**	.5	.5	4.2
Career		178	45	12.7	.428	.260	.786	2.2	.6	.4	.3	3.6

==== Playoffs ====
Year	Team	GP	GS	MPG	FG%	3P%	FT%	RPG	APG	SPG	BPG	PPG
2022	Brooklyn	2	0	**3.5**	—	—	—	.0	**.5**	**.5**	.0	.0
2023	Sacramento	**6**	0	1.2	—	—	—	**.2**	.0	.0	.0	.0
Career		8	0	1.8	—	—	—	.1	.1	.1	.0	.0

=== College ===
Year	Team	GP	GS	MPG	FG%	3P%	FT%	RPG	APG	SPG	BPG	PPG
2018–19	Pepperdine	**34**	27	28.8	.438	.370	.694	5.4	1.0	**1.1**	1.0	9.8
2019–20	Pepperdine	31	**31**	32.7	.471	**.437**	.761	**7.4**	**1.5**	.9	**1.8**	13.6
2020–21	Pepperdine	27	26	**33.9**	**.491**	.378	**.876**	6.8	1.2	1.0	1.2	**17.2**
Career		92	84	31.6	.469	.395	.789	6.5	1.2	1.0	1.3	13.3

== Personal life ==
Edwards's older brother, Kameron, played college basketball for Pepperdine before embarking on a professional career.
