= Isaiah Todd =

American basketball player (born 2001)

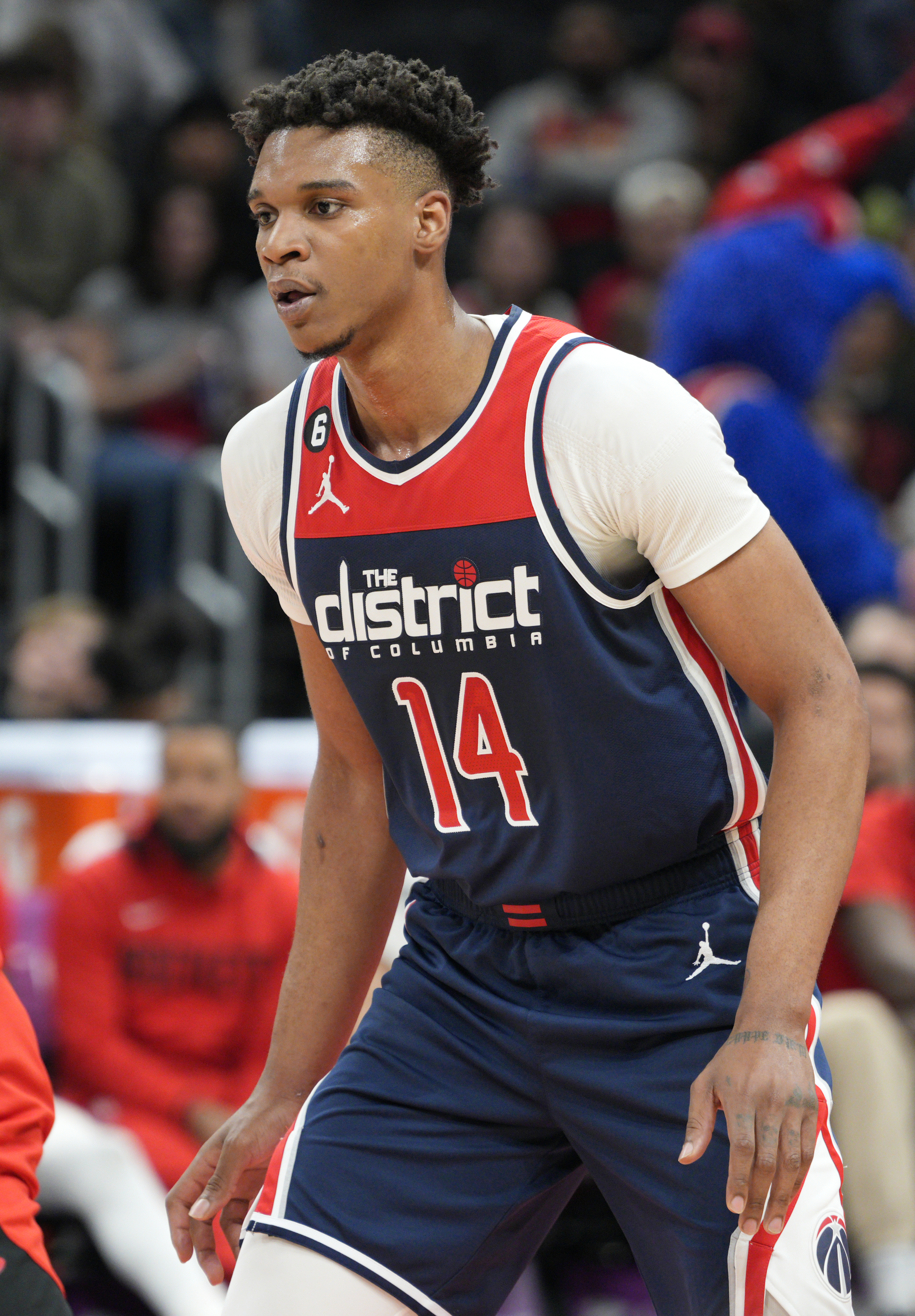
- Todd with the Washington Wizards in 2023

Personal information
- Born: October 17, 2001 (age 25) Baltimore, Maryland, U.S.
- Listed height: 6 ft 9 in (2.06 m)
- Listed weight: 219 lb (99 kg)

Career information
- High school: John Marshall (Richmond, Virginia); Trinity Academy (Raleigh, North Carolina); Word of God Christian Academy (Raleigh, North Carolina)
- NBA draft: 2021: 2nd round, 31st overall pick
- Drafted by: Milwaukee Bucks
- Playing career: 2020–2026
- Position: Power forward

Career history
- 2020–2021: NBA G League Ignite
- 2021–2023: Washington Wizards
- 2021–2023: →Capital City Go-Go
- 2023–2024: NBA G League Ignite
- 2024–2025: Šiauliai–Casino Admiral
- 2025–2026: Kaohsiung Steelers
- 2026: Gence

Career highlights
- McDonald's All-American (2020)
- Stats at NBA.com
- Stats at Basketball Reference
Medals
Men's basketball
Representing the United States
FIBA Americas Under-16 Championship
Gold medal – first place	2017 Argentina	Team

Isaiah Todd (born October 17, 2001) is an American former professional basketball player. He was a consensus five-star recruit and one of the best power forwards in the 2020 class. A former Michigan commit, Todd chose to forgo his college eligibility to become the last player to sign with NBA G League Ignite before it ceased operations. He finished his high school career at the Word of God Christian Academy in Raleigh, North Carolina.

== Early life ==
Born in Baltimore, Maryland, Todd was raised by his mother, Marlene Venable, and did not know his father well. His mother sold cocaine and heroin at age twelve and served over three years in prison when she was sixteen. She was released from prison about four years before Todd's birth. When Todd started playing basketball, at age seven, he stood five feet tall. At that age, he met his first coach, Derrick Wilson, and began playing on recreational teams and on the Amateur Athletic Union (AAU) circuit. Before eighth grade, Todd moved to Richmond, Virginia so that he could play year-round for his AAU program, Team Loaded.

== High school career ==
In his first two years of high school, Todd played basketball for John Marshall High School in Richmond. As a freshman, he averaged 12.8 points and 6.5 rebounds per game, leading his team to district and regional titles. Todd was considered one of the area's best prospects since Basketball Hall of Fame inductee Moses Malone. As a sophomore, Todd averaged 18.6 points, 6.5 rebounds and 1.8 blocks per game, shooting 39 percent from three-point range, to help John Marshall win the Class 3 state championship. He was recognized as the Class 3 State Player of the Year and earned first-team All-Metro honors.

For his junior season, Todd transferred to Trinity Academy, a private Christian school in Raleigh, North Carolina, on a scholarship. He was drawn there by coach Bryan Burrell, who he had previously worked with. Moving to Raleigh also allowed him to work closely with his personal trainer, Drew Hanlen. Todd led the team, which had been coming off two losing seasons, to a 21–12 record while averaging 28 points and 15 rebounds per game. He was named USA Today All-USA North Carolina Player of the Year. Todd transferred to another private Christian school in Raleigh, Word of God Christian Academy, for his final high school season, playing under Byron Williams in The Grind Session. As a senior, he was selected to play in the McDonald's All-American Game and the Jordan Brand Classic, but both games were cancelled due to the COVID-19 pandemic.

=== Recruiting ===
Entering his sophomore season at John Marshall, Todd was ranked as the number one recruit in the 2020 class by ESPN. On October 17, 2019, he committed to play college basketball for Michigan over offers from Kansas, Kentucky and North Carolina, among others. At the time, Todd was a consensus top-15 player in his class. On April 14, 2020, he decommitted from Michigan and announced that he would forgo his college eligibility to pursue a professional career.

College recruiting
Name	Hometown	School	Height	Weight	Commit date
Isaiah Todd; PF	Richmond, VA	Word of God Christian Academy (NC)	6 ft 10 in (2.08 m)	206 lb (93 kg)	Oct 17, 2019
Isaiah Todd; PF	Recruit ratings: Rivals: 247Sports: ESPN: (94)				
Overall recruit ranking: Rivals: 20 247Sports: 30 ESPN: 15
Note: In many cases, Scout, Rivals, 247Sports, On3, and ESPN may conflict in their listings of height and weight.; In these cases, the average was taken. ESPN grades are on a 100-point scale.; Sources: "Michigan 2020 Basketball Commitments". Rivals.; "2020 Michigan Wolverines Recruiting Class". ESPN.; "2020 Team Ranking". Rivals.

== Professional career ==
=== NBA G League Ignite (2020–2021) ===
On April 17, 2020, Todd signed a one-year contract with the NBA G League Ignite, a developmental team affiliated with the NBA G League. He was drawn to the G League because he wanted to "learn from pros and learn from NBA coaches and trainers." Todd averaged 12.3 points and 4.9 rebounds per game.

=== Washington Wizards (2021–2023) ===
Todd was selected in the second round of the 2021 NBA draft with the 31st pick by the Milwaukee Bucks. He was subsequently traded to the Indiana Pacers for the draft rights of the 54th and 60th picks, Sandro Mamukelashvili and Georgios Kalaitzakis, and two future second-round draft picks. He was then traded to his hometown team, the Washington Wizards, alongside Aaron Holiday for the draft rights of Isaiah Jackson, in a five-team trade.

On January 28, 2022, the Wizards suspended Todd for one game for "conduct detrimental to the team."

Todd appeared in 12 games for the Wizards during the 2021–2022 season.

On June 24, 2023, the Wizards traded Todd, along with Jordan Goodwin and Bradley Beal, to the Phoenix Suns in exchange for a package that included four first-round pick swaps, six second-round picks, Landry Shamet, and Chris Paul. On July 11, the Memphis Grizzlies acquired Todd and the rights to two future first-round pick swaps from the Suns in exchange for three second-round picks. However, on September 30, they waived him.

=== Return to the Ignite (2023–2024) ===
On October 30, 2023, Todd re-signed with the NBA G League Ignite in what later became their final season of play.

=== Šiauliai–Casino Admiral (2024–2025) ===
On November 29, 2024, Todd signed with Šiauliai–Casino Admiral of the Lithuanian Basketball League. On January 10, 2025, he parted ways with the team, replacing by Greg Whittington.

=== Kaohsiung Steelers (2025–2026) ===
On February 21, 2025, Todd signed with Kaohsiung Steelers of the P. League+.

=== Gence (2026) ===
In October 2026, Todd signed with Gence of the Azerbaijan Basketball League (ABL). He appeared in 1 game on October 13, scoring 7 points.

=== Retirement ===
On October 17, 2026, Todd announced on social media that he was retiring from playing professional basketball.

== Career statistics ==
Legend
GP	Games played	GS	Games started	MPG	Minutes per game
FG%	Field goal percentage	3P%	3-point field goal percentage	FT%	Free throw percentage
RPG	Rebounds per game	APG	Assists per game	SPG	Steals per game
BPG	Blocks per game	PPG	Points per game	**Bold**	Career high

=== NBA ===
Year	Team	GP	GS	MPG	FG%	3P%	FT%	RPG	APG	SPG	BPG	PPG
2021–22	Washington	**12**	0	6.2	**.269**	**.250**	.333	1.0	.3	**.3**	**.2**	**1.7**
2022–23	Washington	6	**1**	**10.2**	.167	.100	**1.000**	**2.0**	**.7**	.2	.0	1.5
Career		18	1	7.5	.227	.192	.500	1.3	.4	.3	.1	1.6

== National team career ==
Todd won a gold medal with the United States at the 2017 FIBA Under-16 Americas Championship in Formosa, Argentina. He averaged 5.4 points and 5.2 rebounds per game in five games.
