= Gondrezick =

Gondrezick is a surname. Notable people with the surname include a family of American basketball players:

- Glen Gondrezick (1955–2009)
- Grant Gondrezick (1963–2021), brother of Glen
- Kysre Gondrezick (born 1997), daughter of Grant
