= NBA Most Valuable Player (disambiguation) =

The NBA Most Valuable Player is awarded annually to the league's best performing player of the regular season.

Other MVP awards given by the NBA include:

- NBA Finals Most Valuable Player
- NBA conference finals most valuable player
- NBA All-Star Game Most Valuable Player
