= Jays (Boston Celtics) =

American basketball player duo

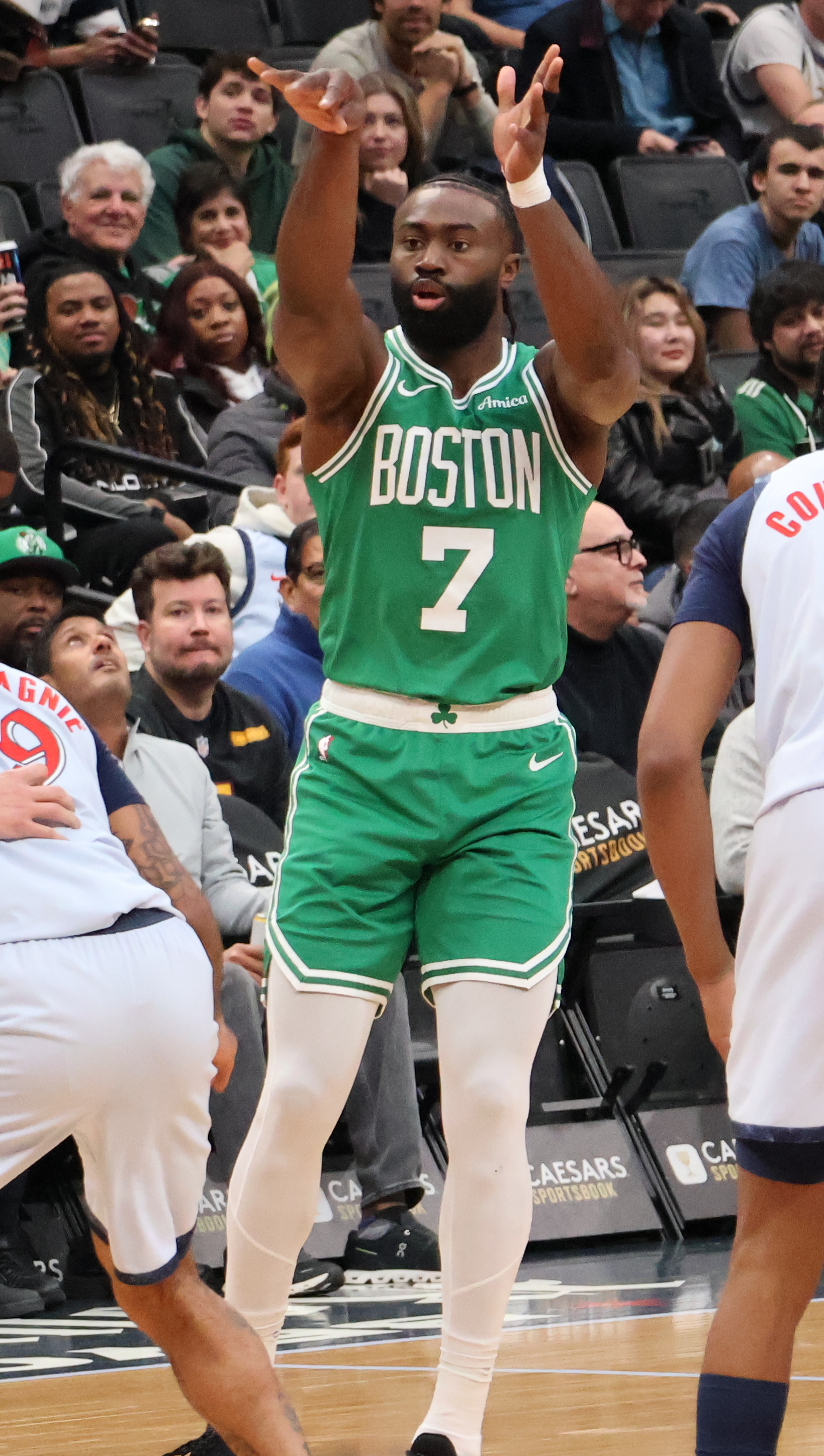
Jaylen Brown

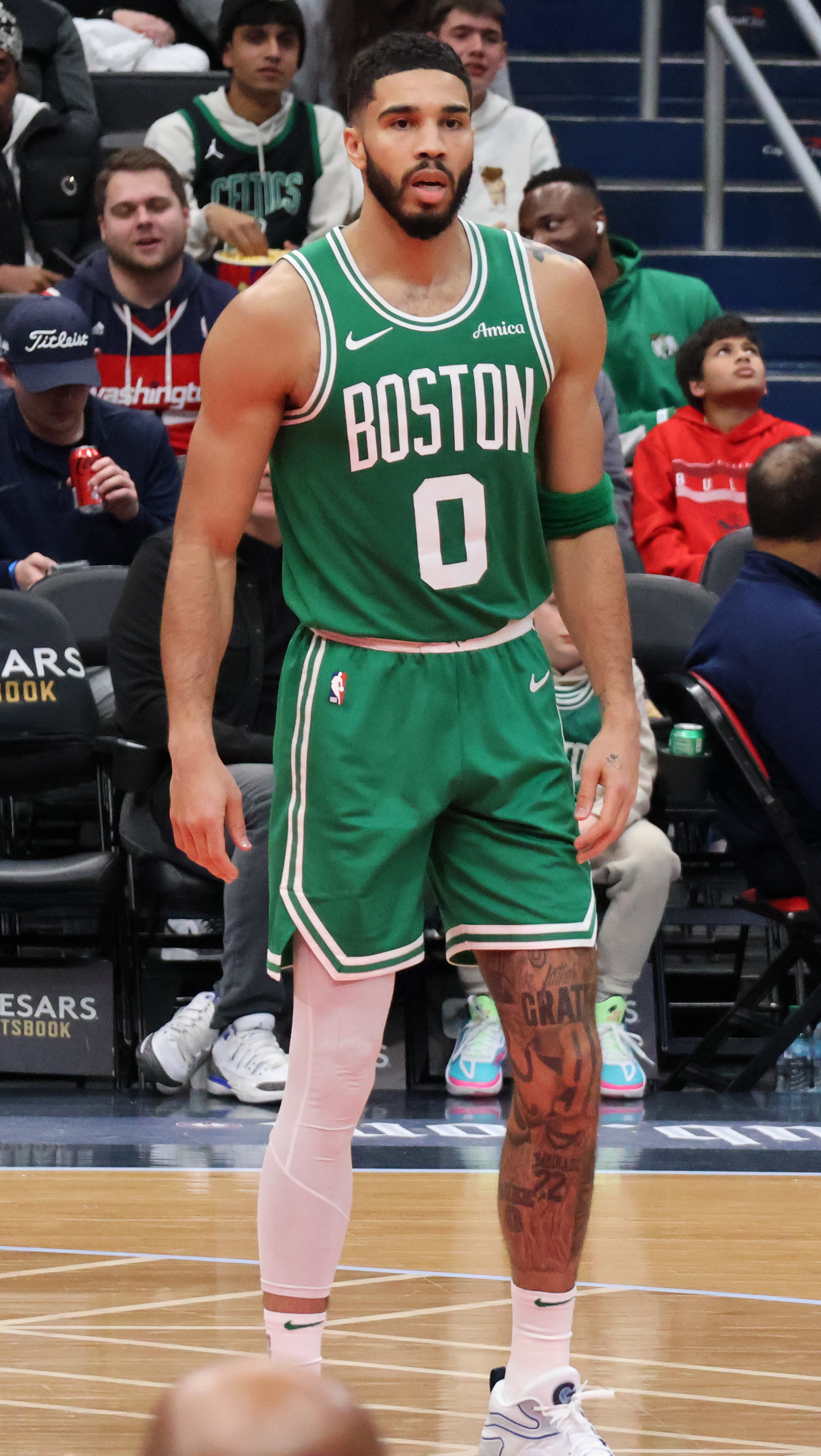
Jayson Tatum

The Jays are the former duo turned rivalry of American professional basketball players, Jaylen Brown and Jayson Tatum, who played for the Boston Celtics of the National Basketball Association (NBA) from 2017 to 2026. They were both drafted by the Celtics with the third overall pick, in 2016 and 2017, respectively. In their nine seasons together, the Jays led the Celtics to five Eastern Conference Finals (Note: Boston and Brown appeared in the 2017 Eastern Conference Finals, before Tatum was drafted. If including postseason runs where at least one player was on the roster, the Jays led the Celtics to six Eastern Conference Finals.) and two NBA Finals in 2022 and 2024 (the latter of which they won an NBA championship). Both players have been named the Eastern Conference Finals MVP, while Brown has also been named the NBA Finals MVP. During their time together, they were also consistently regarded as one of the best duos in the NBA.

== Background ==
Both Jaylen Brown and Jayson Tatum were highly ranked prospects in their respective high school classes, with Brown being ranked 4th in the class of 2015 and Tatum ranked 3rd in the class of 2016. both also played one year in college. They were briefly together during Team USA camps, before joining the NBA.

Meanwhile, by 2016, the Boston Celtics had been rebuilding for years, since the collapse of their "Big Three" in the 2012–13 season. Upon Jaylen Brown and Jayson Tatum being drafted third overall in back-to-back years, the Celtics were "almost instantly branded with the hopes of a franchise that was desperately chasing its elusive 18th championship".

== Boston Celtics ==
=== 2017–18: First appearance in the Conference Finals ===
The duo made their debut on October 17, 2017, in the season opener for the 2017–18 season. The Celtics lost on the road against their rival Cleveland Cavaliers, 99–102. Brown scored 25 points, while Tatum had 14 points and 10 rebounds. Through the 2017–18 regular season, Brown averaged 14.5 points, 4.9 rebounds, and 1.6 assists, while Tatum averaged 13.9 points, 5 rebounds, and 1.6 assists. Boston finished the regular season with a record of 55–27, securing the #2-seed in the Eastern Conference.

During the 2018 playoffs, the duo began to truly show their potential. Through the postseason, Brown averaged 18 points, 4.8 rebounds, and 1.4 assists, while Tatum averaged 18.5 points, 4.4 rebounds, and 2.7 assists. On April 22, 2018, in Game 4 of the first round against Milwaukee Bucks, the Celtics narrowly lost on the road 104–102. However, Brown and Tatum combined to score 55 points, making them the first duo under 22 years old to do so since Kevin Durant and Russell Westbrook. This performance was seen as a key moment in the duo's rise. The Celtics would make it all the way to the Eastern Conference Finals, where they lost to the Cavaliers in seven games. After the end of the Celtics' season, a writer for the Associated Press wrote: "With the rookie Tatum and second-year Jaylen Brown, Boston established itself as the team of the future in the East."

=== 2018–19: Semifinals Loss to Milwaukee ===
In the 2018–19 regular season, statistically, Brown took a slight step back, while Tatum improved, compared to the previous season. Brown averaged 13 points, 4.2 rebounds, and 1.4 assists, while Tatum averaged 15.7 points, 6 rebounds, and 2.1 assists. The Celtics finished the regular season with a record of 49–33, securing the #4-seed in the Eastern Conference.

In the 2019 playoffs, Brown averaged 13.9 points, 5.8 rebounds, and 1.1 assists, while Tatum averaged 15.2 points, 6.7 rebounds, and 1.9 assists. The Celtics made it to the Eastern Conference Semifinals, where they lost to the Milwaukee Bucks in five games.

=== 2019–20: NBA Bubble and Return to the Conference Finals ===
During the 2019–20 regular season, Brown averaged 20.3 points, 6.4 rebounds, and 2.1 assists, while Tatum averaged 23.4 points, seven rebounds, and three assists.

Despite the pandemic, Boston was invited to the NBA Bubble for the 2020 playoffs as the #3-seed in the Eastern Conference. In Orlando, Brown averaged 21.8 points, 7.5 rebounds, and 2.3 assists, while Tatum averaged a double-double with 25.7 points, 10 rebounds, and five assists. The Celtics returned to the Eastern Conference Finals, but lost to the Miami Heat in six games.

=== 2020–21: First Round Exit ===
During the 2020–21 regular season, Brown averaged 24.7 points, 6 rebounds, and 3.4 assists, while Tatum averaged 26.4 points, 7.4 rebounds, and 4.3 assists. On February 23, 2021, Brown and Tatum were selected for an All-Star Game together for the first time, later considered an important milestone in their partnership. On May 10, it was announced that Brown would miss the rest of the season due to a wrist injury. The Celtics finished the regular season with a 36–36 record, and defeated the Washington Wizards in the Play-In Tournament to secure the #7-seed in the Eastern Conference.

In the 2021 playoffs, without Brown, Tatum averaged 30.6 points, 5.8 rebounds, and 4.6 assists, including a 50 point game in Game 3. The Celtics were eliminated in the first round for the first time in either of the duo's career.

=== 2021–22: First NBA Finals Appearance ===
During the 2021–22 regular season, Brown averaged 23.6 points, 6.1 rebounds, and 3.5 assists, while Tatum averaged 26.9 points, 8 rebounds, and 4.4 assists. Although the Celtics began the season with an 18–21 record, they began a turnaround in January and ended up finishing the regular season as the #2-seed in the Eastern Conference with a 51–31 record.

In the 2022 playoffs, Brown averaged 23.1 points, 6.9 rebounds, and 3.5 assists, while Tatum averaged 25.6 points, 6.7 rebounds, and 6.2 assists. The Celtics advanced to their third Eastern Conference Finals in five years, defeating the Miami Heat in seven games to advance to the duo's first ever NBA Finals. The Celtics went on to lose to the Golden State Warriors in six games despite a 2–1 lead. During the Finals, Brown and Tatum were the highest-scoring players on their team, averaging 23.5 points and 21.5 points, respectively.

=== 2022–23: Another Loss to Miami ===
During the 2022–23 regular season, Brown averaged 26.6 points, 6.9 rebounds, and 3.5 assists, while Tatum averaged 30.1 points, 8.8 rebounds, and 4.6 assists. The Celtics finished the regular season with a 57–25 record, securing the #2-seed in the Eastern Conference.

In the 2023 playoffs, Brown averaged 22.7 points, 5.6 rebounds, and 3.4 assists, while Tatum averaged a double-double with 27.2 points, 10.5 rebounds, and 5.3 assists. Brown and Tatum advanced to their fourth Eastern Conference Finals together in six years, once again facing the Miami Heat. The Celtics faced a 3–0 deficit before coming back to tie the series at 3–3, but lost the series in seven games.

=== 2023–24: 18th Championship ===
Following the Game 7 loss to Miami, Brown and Tatum worked out together during the summer, which they had not done before. The summer workouts reportedly pushed each other and cemented their bond, which carried through the 2023–24 season, where the Jays would lead one of the most dominant seasons in NBA history.

Through the 2023–24 regular season, Brown averaged 23 points, 5.5 rebounds, and 3.6 assists, while Tatum averaged 26.9 points, 8.1 rebounds, and 4.9 assists. On January 10, 2024, Brown and Tatum combined for 80 points, their highest combined scoring total ever, in a home game against the Minnesota Timberwolves, who had the top defense in the NBA. It was the fourth time the pair had both scored 35+ points in the same game, a feat which no other Celtics duo has ever done more than once. The Celtics won 127–120 in overtime, starting 18–0 at home for the first time in franchise history. On January 22, the Celtics defeated the Dallas Mavericks on the road 119–110. Tatum scored 39 points, while Brown scored 34. Notably, they became the first pair of teammates in NBA history to each tally at least 30 points, two blocks, and no turnovers in the same game. On February 18, Tatum and Brown played together in the 2024 NBA All-Star Game. Brown scored 36 points, while Tatum scored 20. Their combined 56 points contributed to the East's 211-point victory, the highest of any team in All-Star Game history. The Celtics finished the 2023–24 regular season with a league-best 64–18 record, securing the top seed in the Eastern Conference.

The Celtics also dominated in the 2024 playoffs. Through the postseason, Brown averaged 23.9 points, 5.9 rebounds, and 3.3 assists, while Tatum averaged nearly a double-double with 25 points, 9.7 rebounds, and 6.3 assists. Boston cruised through the Eastern Conference to reach the 2024 NBA Finals, facing the Mavericks. It was the duo's second Finals appearance in three years. In Game 3, Brown and Tatum became the second Celtics duo ever to each score 30+ points in a Finals game. Five days later in Game 5, with Boston leading the series 3–1, the duo combined for 52 points, winning the game, series, and championship. It was the duo's first championship, Boston's first championship since 2008, and Boston's 18th championship overall. The Celtics' 16–3 playoffs record was the second-best win percentage since 2003, when all four rounds became best-of-seven. The 107 postseason games for Brown and Tatum were the most of any star duo before winning a championship. Additionally, by the end of the 2024 playoffs, Tatum was first in playoff points scored before age 27, while Brown was sixth. Overall, in the Finals, Brown averaged 20.8 points, 5.4 rebounds, and five assists, while Tatum averaged 22.2 points, 7.8 rebounds and 7.2 assists. Despite Tatum having a "strong case", Brown was named NBA Finals MVP. Upon receiving the trophy, he remarked: "I share this with my brothers and my partner in crime, Jayson Tatum. He was with me the whole way."

== Split up and Rivalry ==
=== End of Duo and Beginning of Rivalry ===
In July 2026, the Celtics traded Brown to the Philadelphia 76ers for Paul George and 4 draft picks, officially ending the Jays Duo. On October 22, 2026, Tatum appeared in a documentary where he shared that he allegedly had no knowledge that the Celtics were going to trade Brown. Less than a day later, Brown responded to Tatum's claims with a "Cap" emoji.

One day after Tatum's documentary, he stated that he and Brown had no beef, making references to the split of Shaquille O'Neal and Kobe Bryant. A day later, Brown had a post-game press conference after he and the 76ers secured a 127-116 victory against the Milwaukee Bucks, where he tried to clarify that he had no beef with Tatum. However, Brown followed that statement by saying, "But it might be a little lamb chops and some gravy."

=== 2026-27: Cold shoulders ===
On November 10, 2026, the Jays played their first regular game against each other. Right before tip-off at the Xfinity Mobile Arena, Tatum walked over to Brown to tap his chest and say hello, but Brown completely refused to acknowledge him and stared straight ahead. Brown ended up having a rough night, finishing with 13 points, 5 rebounds, and a game-worst -27 as the Sixers fell to Boston 123-101, making the Celtics take the 1st seed in the Eastern Conference from the 76ers. Tatum scored 21 points, while former Sixer Paul George led the Celtics with 36 points. After the game, Brown claimed he wasn't paying attention to the pre-game interaction and gave credit to Tatum for playing well, while Tatum similarly downplayed the drama to focus on the win.

== See also ==
- Splash Brothers
- Twin Towers
