= Jayson Tatum =

American basketball player (born 1998)

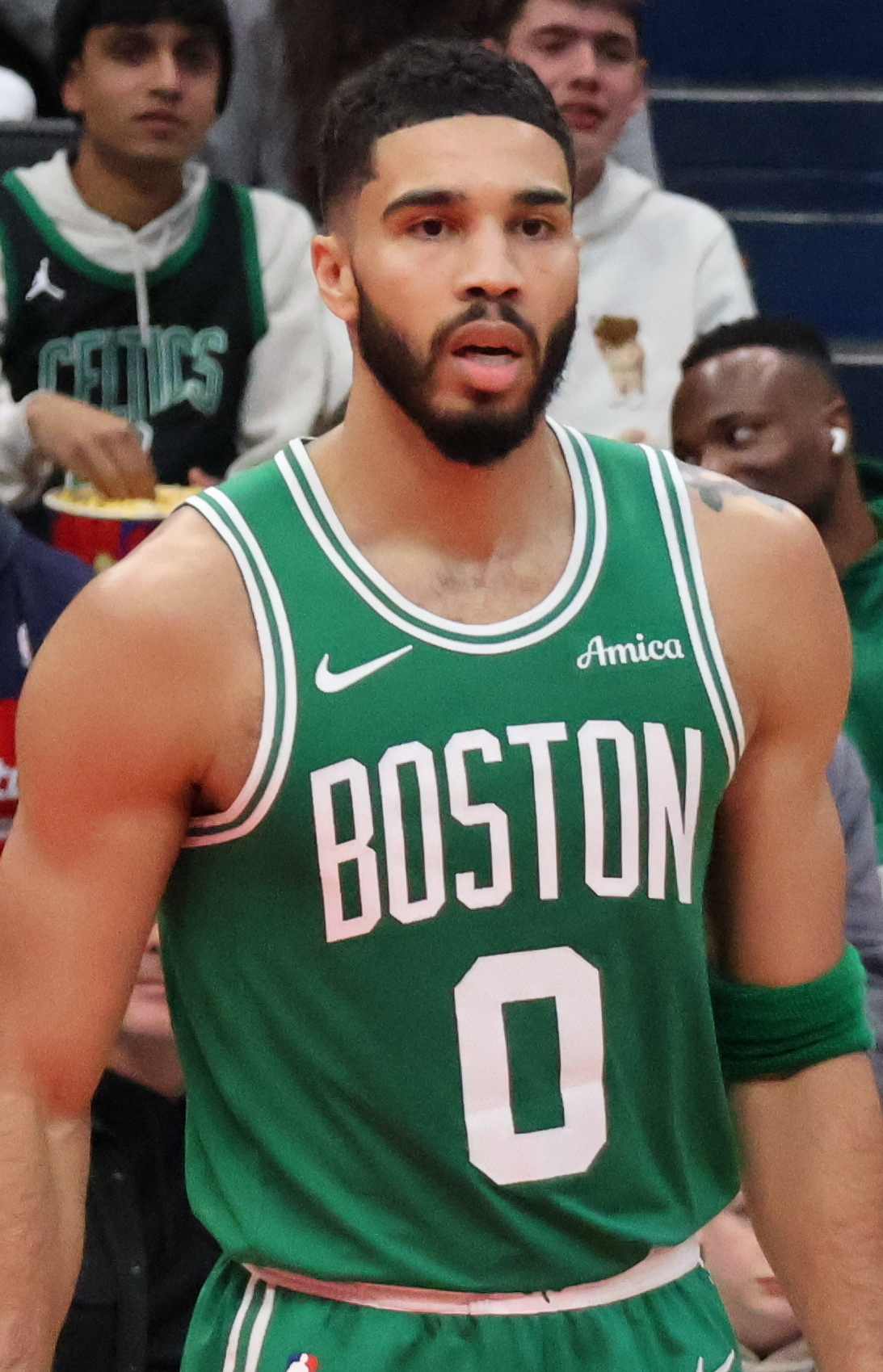
- Tatum with the Boston Celtics in 2024

No. 0 – Boston Celtics
- Position: Small forward / power forward
- League: NBA

Personal information
- Born: March 3, 1998 (age 28) St. Louis, Missouri, U.S.
- Listed height: 6 ft 8 in (2.03 m)
- Listed weight: 229 lb (104 kg)

Career information
- High school: Chaminade (Creve Coeur, Missouri)
- College: Duke (2016–2017)
- NBA draft: 2017: 1st round, 3rd overall pick
- Drafted by: Boston Celtics
- Playing career: 2017–present

Career history
- 2017–present: Boston Celtics

Career highlights
- NBA champion (2024); 6× NBA All-Star (2020–2025); NBA All-Star Game MVP (2023); 4× All-NBA First Team (2022–2025); All-NBA Third Team (2020); NBA Eastern Conference finals MVP (2022); NBA All-Rookie First Team (2018); Third-team All-ACC (2017); ACC All-Freshman team (2017); Gatorade National Player of the Year (2016); McDonald's All-American (2016); Mr. Show-Me Basketball (2016)
- Stats at NBA.com
- Stats at Basketball Reference
Medals
Men's basketball
Representing the United States
Olympic Games
| Gold medal – first place | 2020 Tokyo | Team |
| Gold medal – first place | 2024 Paris | Team |
FIBA U19 World Championship
| Gold medal – first place | 2015 Greece | Team |
FIBA U17 World Championship
| Gold medal – first place | 2014 Dubai | Team |

Jayson Christopher Tatum Sr. (/ˈteɪtəm/ TAY-təm; born March 3, 1998) is an American professional basketball player for the Boston Celtics of the National Basketball Association (NBA). He was a McDonald's All-American in high school in Missouri and played college basketball for the Duke Blue Devils. Tatum was selected by the Boston Celtics with the third overall pick in the 2017 NBA draft and was voted to the NBA All-Rookie First Team in the 2018 season. Tatum won the inaugural NBA Eastern Conference finals MVP in 2022, and won his first title in the 2024 NBA Finals.

Nicknamed "the Anomaly", Tatum is a six-time NBA All-Star and five-time All-NBA selection (including four first-team selections). He and Jaylen Brown made up the Celtics' "Jays" duo from Tatum’s rookie season until 2026. In 2024, Tatum led the team to a league-best 64 wins and a championship in the NBA Finals. Tatum also won a gold medal with the 2020 and 2024 U.S. Olympic teams. He holds the records for most points scored in an NBA All-Star Game (55), most points scored in a Game 7 of any NBA playoffs series (51), and most points scored in the NBA playoffs at his age.

== High school career ==
Tatum attended Chaminade College Preparatory School in Creve Coeur, Missouri. He was inspired by Bradley Beal, a senior at Chaminade, while Tatum was in his first year there as a seventh grader. Tatum struggled with the school's college preparatory curriculum, and his classmates were substantially more privileged than he was. Tatum played alongside Tyler Cook and was in gym class with classmate Matthew Tkachuk. Tatum wanted to play under his father, the head basketball coach at nearby Christian Brothers College High School, but his mother preferred Chaminade so Tatum would still work hard on academics.

As a freshman, Tatum averaged 13.3 points and 6.4 rebounds per game and was named 2013 Metro Catholic Conference (MCC) Co-Player of the Year, leading the Red Devils to both MCC and Missouri District 2 crowns.

As a sophomore in 2014, Tatum averaged 26.0 points and 11.0 rebounds per game.

As a junior, Tatum averaged 25.9 points, 11.7 rebounds, and 3.4 assists per game, while earning Second-team Naismith Trophy All-American honors. In the summer of 2015, he joined the St. Louis Eagles Amateur Athletic Union (AAU) team on the highly competitive Nike Elite Youth Basketball League (EYBL) Circuit. On July 11, the Eagles narrowly defeated future Duke teammate Harry Giles and Team CP3 74–73 in the Nike Peach Jam Semi-Finals with a game-winning buzzer-beater to advance to the championship game, where Tatum finished the game with 28 points and five rebounds. The next day, he had 24 points, seven rebounds, and four blocks in a 104–77 loss to the Georgia Stars and future Duke one-and-done Wendell Carter Jr. in the 2015 Nike Peach Jam championship game. During the Circuit, Tatum led the EYBL in scoring with 26.5 points to go along with 9.5 rebounds per game.

Before his senior year, Tatum made a verbal commitment to Duke University over North Carolina, Kentucky, and Saint Louis University.

Tatum at the Jordan Brand Classic in April 2016

As a senior in 2015–16, Tatum averaged 29.6 points and 9.1 rebounds and posted six 40-point games while leading Chaminade to its second Missouri Class 5A state championship. Among his senior year highlights were a 40-point, 17-rebound game in a 76–57 victory over Bentonville High School and its star Malik Monk, a 46-point game against Huntington Prep and Miles Bridges at the Cancer Research Classic, and a final 40-point game against DeMatha Catholic High School and future #1 NBA draft pick Markelle Fultz at the 2016 HoopHall Classic.

Tatum was selected to the 2016 McDonald's All-American Game on March 30, 2016, at the United Center in Chicago, leading the East Team in scoring with 18 points and grabbing eight rebounds in a 114–107 loss. In April, Tatum played in the Jordan Brand Classic, where he scored 18 points in a 131–117 victory over the West team. Tatum was named the 2016 Gatorade National Player of the Year.

=== Recruiting ===
Tatum was rated a five-star recruit and was ranked as the No. 3 overall recruit behind Harry Giles and Josh Jackson and No. 2 small forward in the 2016 high school class.

College recruiting
| Name | Hometown | School | Height | Weight | Commit date |
|---|---|---|---|---|---|
| Jayson Tatum; SF | St. Louis, MO | Chaminade College Prep | 6 ft 8 in (2.03 m) | 205 lb (93 kg) | Jul 12, 2015 |
| Jayson Tatum; SF | Recruit ratings: Scout: Rivals: 247Sports: ESPN: (97) | | | | |
Overall recruit ranking: Scout: 4 Rivals: 3 ESPN: 3
Note: In many cases, Scout, Rivals, 247Sports, On3, and ESPN may conflict in their listings of height and weight.; In these cases, the average was taken. ESPN grades are on a 100-point scale.; Sources: "2016 Duke Basketball Commitment List". Rivals.; "2016 Team Ranking". Rivals.

== College career ==
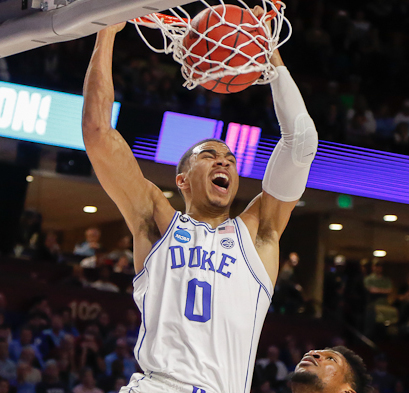
Tatum finishes a slam dunk in 2017

Tatum missed the first eight games of the 2016–17 season due to a foot injury. On December 3, 2016, in his Duke debut, Tatum recorded 10 points in a 94–55 blowout victory over Maine. Three days later, he had 22 points and eight rebounds in an 84–74 victory over Florida at the Jimmy V Classic. On December 12, he was named ACC freshman of the week. On December 21, Tatum had 18 points, eight rebounds, and four blocks in a 72–61 victory over Elon. On January 4, 2017, he scored 19 points in a 110–57 blowout victory over Georgia Tech. Three days later, Tatum recorded 22 points and six rebounds in a 93–82 victory over Boston College. On January 21, he scored 14 points in a 70–58 victory over Miami. On February 13, Tatum earned his second ACC freshman of the week honor. Two days later, Tatum recorded a season-high 28 points and eight rebounds in a 65–55 victory over Virginia. On February 18, Tatum scored 19 points in a 99–94 victory over Wake Forest. As the fifth seed in the ACC tournament, Duke defeated Clemson in the second round and Louisville in the quarterfinals. On March 10, Tatum scored 24 points in a 93–83 victory over rival North Carolina in the semifinals. The next day, he tallied 19 points and eight rebounds in a 75–69 victory over Notre Dame, earning the Blue Devils the ACC tournament championship.

Tatum was named to the All-ACC Tournament team after averaging 22.0 points, 7.5 rebounds, and 1.5 steals per game for the Blue Devils. As the #2-seed entering the NCAA tournament, Duke defeated Troy in the first round but exited early in a second-round loss against South Carolina. Tatum averaged 16.5 points and 7.5 rebounds per game in the tournament. In his freshman season for Duke in 2016–17, Tatum played 29 games and averaged 16.8 points, 7.3 rebounds, 2.1 assists, and 1.3 steals per game. He was named to the ACC All-Freshman team and a third-team All-ACC selection. Tatum had a successful freshman season at Duke, ranking fourth in made free throws (118), fifth in rebounds, and fourth in free throw percentage (.849).

At the end of his freshman season, Tatum opted to enter the 2017 NBA draft as a one-and-done, where he was projected as a first-round selection.

== Professional career ==
=== Boston Celtics (2017–present) ===
==== 2017–18 season: Rookie season ====
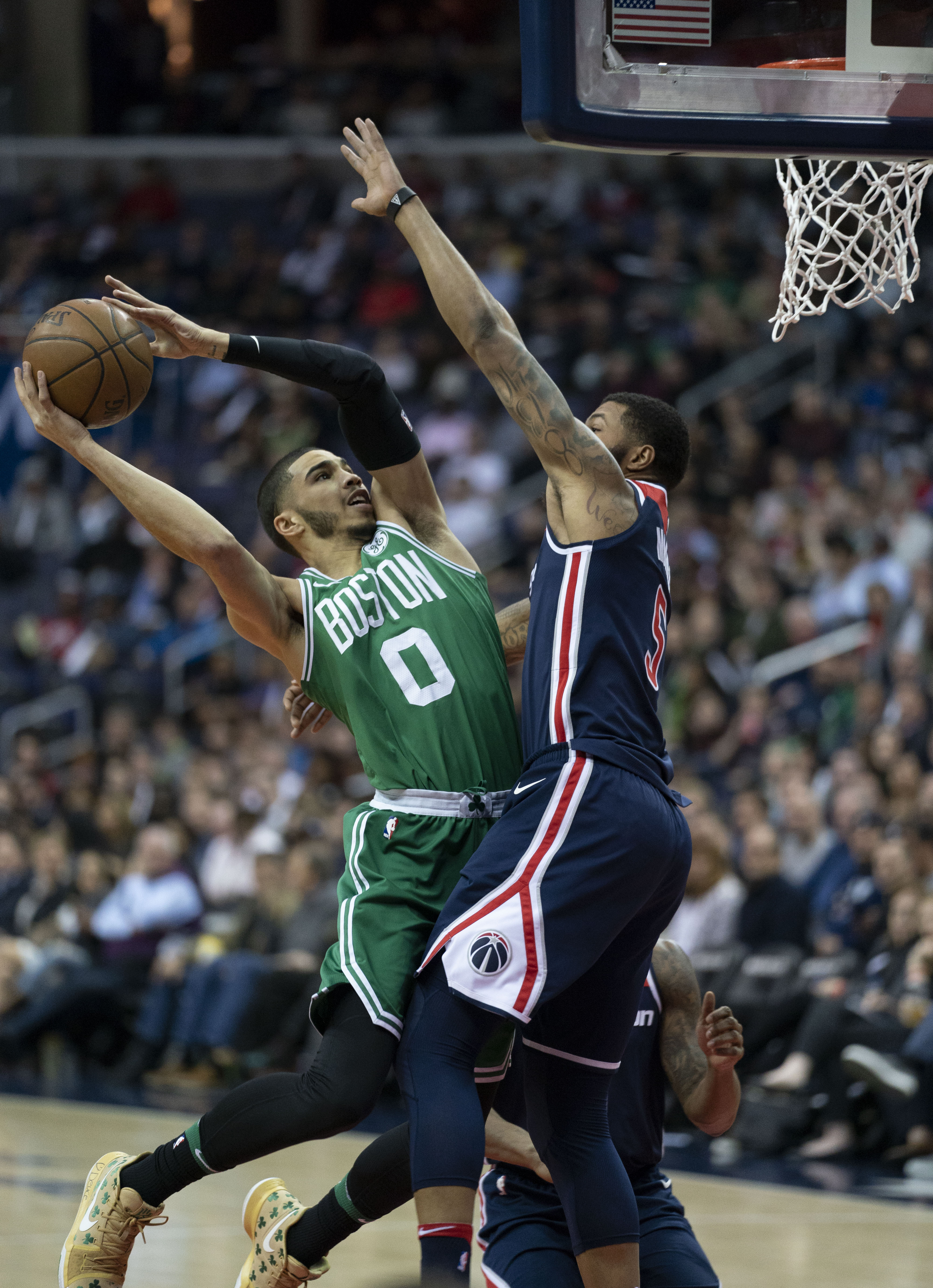
Tatum (left) attempting a shot against the Washington Wizards in April 2018

Boston Celtics general manager Danny Ainge traded the team's No. 1 overall pick in the 2017 NBA draft to the Philadelphia 76ers for the third overall pick, which the Celtics used to select Jayson Tatum. Tatum was the Celtics' second consecutive No. 3 pick for a small forward, following Jaylen Brown in 2016, whom Tatum formed a duo with. During the 2017 NBA Summer League event in Utah, Tatum averaged 18.7 points, 9.7 rebounds, 2.3 steals, and 2.0 assists in nearly 33 minutes of action. Later, in Las Vegas, Tatum produced similar results, averaging 17.7 points, 8.0 rebounds, 1.0 assists, and 0.8 blocks in nearly 32 minutes of action in three games. Tatum was named to the All-Summer League Second Team alongside Bryn Forbes, Cheick Diallo, Wayne Selden Jr., and Kyle Kuzma.

In his NBA debut on October 17, 2017, Tatum recorded a double-double with 14 points and 10 rebounds as the team's starting power forward during the season-opening 102–99 loss to the Cleveland Cavaliers. He then recorded a season-high 24 points in a 110–89 victory over the New York Knicks on October 24. Tatum was named the Eastern Conference's Rookie of the Month for December 2017.

The Celtics finished the season with a 55–27 record, entering the 2018 NBA playoffs as the #2-seed in the Eastern Conference. On April 15, 2018, in Game 1 of the first-round series against the #7-seed Milwaukee Bucks, Tatum recorded a double-double with 19 points and 10 rebounds in a 113–107 overtime victory. Exactly a week later in Game 4, he broke his playoff-high with 21 points, and then broke it again on April 26 in Game 6 with 22. Two days later, the Celtics defeated the Bucks in Game 7 by a score of 112–96, with Tatum scoring 20 points.

On April 30, in Game 1 of the second-round series against the #3-seed Philadelphia 76ers, Tatum had a then career-high 28 points during a 117–101 victory, becoming the first Celtics rookie to score 25 or more points in a playoff game since Larry Bird during the 1980 NBA playoffs, also against the 76ers. Three days later, after posting 21 points in a Game 2 108–103 victory, Tatum became the youngest player ever to score at least 20 points in four straight playoff games at the age of 20 years, 61 days, surpassing Kobe Bryant who accomplished that feat during the 1999 NBA playoffs at the age of 20 years, 272 days. After leading the Celtics with 24 points in a Game 3 101–98 overtime victory in Philadelphia on May 5, Tatum became the first Celtics rookie to score 20 points in five straight playoff games. Bird held the previous record of four. At the end of his playoff run, Tatum joined Kareem Abdul-Jabbar as the only rookies in playoff history to record 10 games of 20 or more points scored during their first playoff runs; LeBron James praised Tatum's work, stating: "He's built for stardom."

On May 22, 2018, Tatum was named to the NBA All-Rookie Team (First Team).

==== 2018–19 season: Sophomore season ====
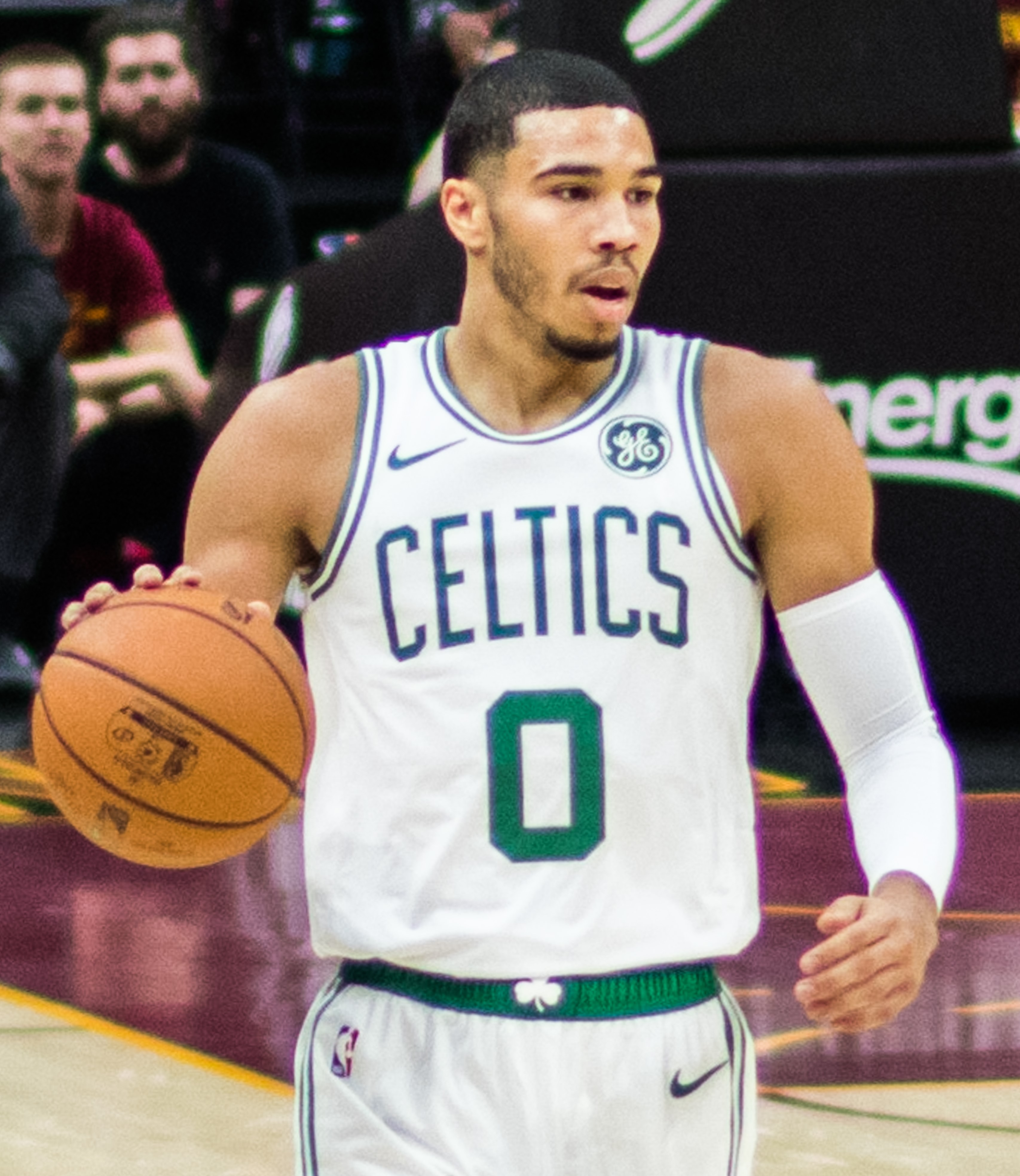
Tatum in October 2018

On October 16, 2018, during the season-opening 105–87 victory over the Philadelphia 76ers, Tatum recorded 23 points, nine rebounds, and three assists. Four days later, he had 24 points and 14 rebounds in a narrow 103–101 victory over the New York Knicks. On October 25, Tatum tallied 24 points and six rebounds in a 101–95 victory over the Oklahoma City Thunder. On November 16, he recorded 21 points and seven rebounds in a 123–116 overtime victory over the Toronto Raptors. On December 25, Tatum had 23 points and 10 rebounds in a 121–114 overtime victory over the Philadelphia 76ers. On February 5, 2019, he recorded 25 points and seven rebounds in a 103–96 victory over the Cleveland Cavaliers. On March 6, Tatum recorded 24 points, three rebounds, and two assists in a 126–120 victory over the Sacramento Kings. During NBA All-Star Weekend, he won the Skills Challenge competition.

==== 2019–20 season: First All-Star and All-NBA appearances ====
On December 22, 2019, Tatum recorded a then career-high 39 points, along with 12 rebounds, in a 119–93 victory over the Charlotte Hornets. He would exceed that with a then career-high 41 points against the New Orleans Pelicans in a 140–105 victory on January 11, 2020. On January 30, Tatum was named an NBA All-Star for the first time in his career, being selected as an Eastern Conference reserve. On February 13, Tatum would again score 39 points, while playing 47 minutes and leading the Celtics to a 141–133 double-overtime victory over the Los Angeles Clippers. On February 23, he matched his then career-high 41 points in a narrow 114–112 loss to the Los Angeles Lakers. As the season was halted by the COVID-19 pandemic, Tatum shot 2-of-18 in a 119–112 loss to the Milwaukee Bucks on July 31, but he bounced back the next game scoring 34 points on 11-of-22 shooting in a 128–124 victory over the Portland Trail Blazers on August 2. Tatum was named to the All-NBA Third Team and his first selection of his career.

In the 2020 NBA playoffs, the Celtics were able to advance to the Eastern Conference Finals for the second time in Tatum's three years in the NBA following series victories over the Philadelphia 76ers and Toronto Raptors in four and seven games, respectively. However, Boston was eliminated in the Conference Finals by the Miami Heat in six games. In Game 1, with the Celtics trailing by two in the closing seconds, Tatum's game-tying dunk attempt was blocked by Heat center Bam Adebayo with 4.8 seconds left and propelled Miami to a 117–114 victory.

==== 2020–21 season: Play-in appearance and first round exit ====
On November 22, 2020, Tatum and the Celtics agreed to a rookie maximum extension of five years, worth $163 million, with the possibility of it rising to $195.6 million if Tatum made All-NBA in the 2020–21 season.

During the narrow season-opening 122–121 victory over the Milwaukee Bucks on December 23, 2020, Tatum totaled 30 points and seven rebounds, alongside a game-winning three-pointer. On January 3, 2021, he had 24 points and a career-high 12 assists and made another game-winning shot in a narrow 122–120 victory over the Detroit Pistons. The next day, Tatum scored a season-high 40 points in a 126–114 victory over the Toronto Raptors. On January 9, it was confirmed that he had tested positive for COVID-19 and missed multiple games. On February 23, Tatum was named an Eastern Conference reserve for the 2021 NBA All-Star Game, marking his second All-Star game in a row.

On April 9, Tatum had a then-career-high 53 points, 16 made field goals, and 15 made free throws in a 145–136 victory over the Minnesota Timberwolves. With his career night, Tatum was the youngest Celtics player to score 50+ points; he also scored the third-highest number of points in a Celtics uniform, behind Larry Bird and Kevin McHale, and became the second player in Celtics history to score 50+ points and grab 10+ rebounds since Bird did so back in November 1989. Tatum and Zach LaVine of the Chicago Bulls became the second pair of players in the 2020–21 season to score 50+ points on the same day. On April 19, Tatum recorded his first career triple-double with 14 points, 13 rebounds, and 10 assists in a 102–96 loss to the Bulls.

On April 30, Tatum brought the Celtics back from a 32-point deficit against the San Antonio Spurs, a performance that produced the third-largest comeback in NBA history and gave Tatum a career-high of 60 points, tying him with Larry Bird for the highest points total by a Celtics player. Tatum was one of three players to score 60+ points without a single turnover and was named Eastern Conference Player of the Week after averaging 42.7 points per game, 6.0 assists per game, and 6.0 rebounds per game.

In the first game of the play-in tournament on May 18, Tatum scored 50 points, guiding the Celtics to a 118–100 victory over the Washington Wizards and cementing the team as the #7-seed in the Eastern Conference into the 2021 NBA playoffs; Kemba Walker, Tatum's teammate, had 29 points while only one other player (Tristan Thompson) had 10 or more points. Tatum set the record for most points in a single play-in tournament game, became one of an elite list of players who scored 50+ points in play-ins/playoffs, and singlehandedly outscored the Wizards in the third quarter and part of the fourth, and was a perfect 17/17 from the free throw line.

On May 28, in Game 3 of the first-round series against the Brooklyn Nets and their "Big Three" (Kevin Durant, James Harden, and Kyrie Irving), Tatum scored 50 points on 50% shooting (16/30), and put up six rebounds, seven assists, and two steals in the 125–119 victory. With the feat, he achieved a variety of records, becoming the first player in NBA playoff history to score 50 points after scoring single digits the previous game; Tatum also passed 1,000 points in the playoffs and became the fifth-highest postseason point scorer at age 23 or younger in NBA history as well as the first Celtics player since Isaiah Thomas to score 50+ points in the NBA playoffs and the third youngest player in NBA playoff history to reach that mark in a single game. In terms of franchise records, Tatum became just the sixth player in Celtics history to score 50+ points in a playoff game; he also became the only player in NBA history to score 50+ points more than once in the regular season, 50+ points in a play-in game, and 50+ points in the playoffs. Despite losing to the Nets in five games, Tatum set a Celtics franchise record for most points scored in a three-game span in the playoffs, with a combined total of 122 points.

==== 2021–22 season: All-NBA First Team selection and first NBA Finals ====
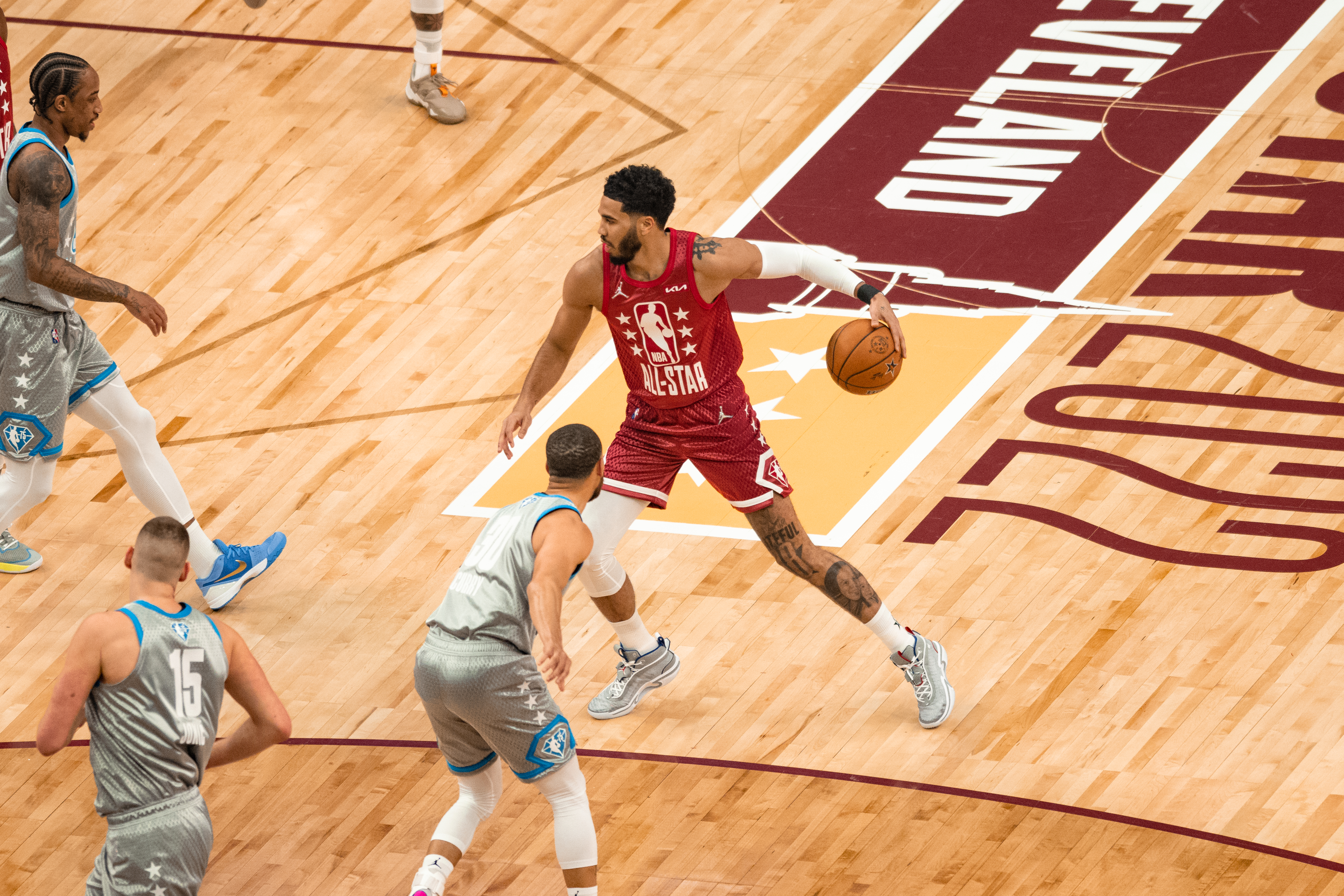
Tatum at the NBA All-Star Game in 2022

Tatum led the league in plus-minus for the first time in his fifth season, cementing his status as one of the most valuable players in the NBA. On October 25, 2021, in a 140–129 overtime victory over the Charlotte Hornets, Tatum recorded 41 points, seven rebounds, and eight assists to lead the Celtics to their first win of the season. On January 23, 2022, he scored a then season-high 51 points along with 10 rebounds, seven assists, and a career-high nine three-pointers in a blowout 116–87 victory over the Washington Wizards. On February 3, Tatum was selected for his third consecutive All-Star appearance. On March 3, Tatum scored 21 of his 37 points in the fourth quarter to go along with six rebounds and five assists in a 120–107 victory over the Memphis Grizzlies. Three days later against the Brooklyn Nets, Tatum topped his season-high with 54 points, scoring 34 of them in the second half of the 126–120 victory. This was the fourth time Tatum had netted 50+ points in a game in his career, tying Larry Bird for the most 50-point games in Celtics history. On March 7, Tatum was named Eastern Conference Player of the Week after averaging 41.3 points per game, 6.3 rebounds per game, and 5.0 assists per game. Two days later against the Hornets, Tatum scored 16 of his 44 points in the fourth quarter of a 115–101 victory. On March 18, in a 126–97 victory over the Sacramento Kings, Tatum and Jaylen Brown each scored at least 30 points in the same game for the fourth time in the season and eighth time overall; this tied the record of most such games with fellow Celtics Larry Bird and Kevin McHale, who also recorded four such games in the 1986–87 NBA season. In the next game, a 124–104 victory over the Denver Nuggets, Tatum and Brown broke the record by both scoring 30 points with over 60% shooting from the field. On March 28, Tatum became the first player in franchise history to be named Player of the Week in back-to-back weeks.

On April 17, during Game 1 of the first round of the playoffs against the Nets, Tatum had 31 points and eight assists. He hit the game-winning layup to narrowly win 115–114. Six days later in Game 3, Tatum posted 39 points, five rebounds, six assists, and a playoff career-high six steals in the 109–103 victory. On April 25, the Celtics swept the Nets 116–112 to advance to the second round of the playoffs. On May 9, in Game 4 of the Eastern Conference Semifinals, Tatum recorded 30 points, 13 rebounds, and five assists during a 116–108 victory over the reigning champion Milwaukee Bucks to tie the series at 2–2. Six days later in Game 6, he tallied 46 points, nine rebounds, and four assists to lead the Celtics to a 108–95 victory and force a Game 7 in Boston. On May 15, in Game 7, Tatum posted 23 points, six rebounds, and eight assists in a 109–81 victory, thus securing the Celtics a place in the Eastern Conference Finals. On May 23, in Game 4 of the Eastern Conference Finals, Tatum recorded 31 points, eight rebounds, and five assists in a 102–82 blowout victory over the Miami Heat to tie the series at 2–2. During the decisive Game 7 of the series six days later, he had 26 points, 10 rebounds, and six assists in a 100–96 victory to lead the Celtics to their first NBA Finals appearance since 2010. Tatum was named the inaugural Eastern Conference Finals MVP after averaging 25.0 points, 8.0 rebounds and 5.5 assists per game in the series. During Game 1 of the Finals on June 2, he led the Celtics to a 120–108 comeback victory over the Golden State Warriors with 13 assists, the most assists recorded by a player in his Finals debut. The Celtics lost the series in six games despite a 2–1 lead. Tatum set the all-time NBA record with 100 turnovers in a single postseason.

==== 2022–23 season: All-Star Game MVP ====
On November 30, 2022, Tatum recorded 49 points and 11 rebounds while making eight three-pointers in a 134–121 victory over the Miami Heat. He became the youngest player in NBA history to make 900 three-pointers, doing so at 24 years old and surpassing the previous record set by Bradley Beal at 25 years old. Tatum became the first NBA player to record multiple games of at least 45 points, 10 rebounds, and eight three-pointers. He also became the sixth NBA player to have multiple games with 45 points or more with 10 or more rebounds while committing at most one turnover, joining Anthony Davis (six games), Michael Jordan, Giannis Antetokounmpo (three each), Kobe Bryant and Carmelo Anthony (two each). Tatum was named Eastern Conference Player of the Month, averaging 31.6 points per game, 7.8 rebounds per game, and 4.5 assists per game in October and November. On December 13, Tatum recorded 44 points, nine rebounds, and six assists in a 122–118 overtime victory over the Los Angeles Lakers. On December 25, Tatum scored 20 of his 41 points in the third quarter to go along with seven rebounds, five assists, and three steals in a 139–118 blowout victory over the Milwaukee Bucks. He and Jaylen Brown (29 points) combined for 70 points in a game for the eighth time in their careers.

On January 5, 2023, Tatum put up his second career triple-double with 29 points, 14 rebounds, and 10 assists in a 124–95 victory over the Dallas Mavericks. Six days later against the New Orleans Pelicans, Tatum had 31 points, 10 rebounds, and four assists in a 125–114 victory. It was the tenth time that he and Brown (41 points) combined to score 70+ points. The Celtics were undefeated in those games. On January 16, Tatum scored a season-high 51 points, along with nine rebounds and five assists on 15-of-23 shooting, 7-of-12 from three, and 14-of-14 from the free throw line during a 130–118 victory over the Charlotte Hornets. He also surpassed Larry Bird for the most 50-point regular season games in Celtics history. Three days later against the Golden State Warriors, in a rematch of the 2022 NBA Finals, Tatum recorded 34 points alongside a career-high 19 rebounds, six assists, and three steals during the 121–118 overtime victory. He became the first Celtic to record 30+ points, 15+ rebounds, and 5+ assists in a game since Paul Pierce did so in 2002. Tatum also became the tenth player in NBA history to reach 9,000 career points before the age of 25. On January 26, Tatum was named an Eastern Conference starter for the 2023 NBA All-Star Game, marking his fourth overall selection and first as a starter. On February 10, he scored 41 points on 5-of-10 shooting from three-point range in a 127–116 victory over the Hornets, becoming the youngest player at 24 years and 244 days old to reach 1,000 career three-pointers. On February 19, playing for the NBA All-Star Game, Tatum tallied 55 points, 10 rebounds, and six assists, breaking Anthony Davis's previous All-Star record high of 52 points, and also won the game's Most Valuable Player award. Tatum also became the first player in NBA history to score at least 50 points in the regular season, the playoffs, and the All-Star Game. On February 25, he had 18 points, 13 rebounds, and six assists while also making the game-winning three-pointer in a 110–107 victory over the Philadelphia 76ers. On March 18, Tatum became the first player of the season to score at least 2,000 points in a 118–117 loss to the Utah Jazz. Three days later, he scored 36 points in a 132–109 victory over the Sacramento Kings. It was Tatum's 39th 30-point game of the season, tying Larry Bird's record for the most 30-point games in a season in Celtics history. On March 24, Tatum scored 34 points, setting a franchise record with his 40th 30-point game of the season, and the Celtics rolled to a 120–95 victory over the Indiana Pacers. Six days later, Tatum put up 40 points on 12-of-18 shooting from the field (8-of-10 from deep) in a 140–99 blowout victory over the Milwaukee Bucks. He also surpassed Paul Pierce for the second-most 40-point games in Celtics history with 22. Tatum finished the season with a 30.1 points per game average, becoming the only player in Celtics history to average at least 30 points per game in a season. His 2,225 total points scored throughout the season was also a league-best mark.

On April 27, in Game 6 of the first-round playoff series against the Atlanta Hawks, Tatum recorded 30 points, 14 rebounds, and six assists during the 128–120 close-out victory. On May 14, in Game 7 of the Eastern Conference Semifinals, he scored a playoff career-high 51 points in a 112–88 victory over the Philadelphia 76ers. Among several records broken, his performance surpassed Stephen Curry (50 points), who had held the record weeks earlier, for the most scored in a game 7, and Tatum became the first player in Celtics history to put up multiple 50-point playoff games.

On May 23, Game 4 of the Eastern Conference Finals, Tatum posted 33 points, 11 rebounds, and seven assists in a 116–99 victory over the Heat. He also surpassed Paul Pierce for the most playoff three-pointers made in Celtics history. The Celtics lost the series in seven games, despite rallying from a 3–0 deficit to force a Game 7.

==== 2023–24 season: First NBA championship ====
On November 4, 2023, Tatum recorded 32 points and 11 rebounds in a 124–114 victory over the Brooklyn Nets and became the youngest Celtic to reach 10,000 career points at 25 years and 246 days of age. On November 20, he scored a season-high 45 points to go along with 13 rebounds and six assists in a 121–118 overtime loss to the Charlotte Hornets. On January 25, 2024, Tatum was named an Eastern Conference starter for the 2024 NBA All-Star Game, marking his fifth consecutive selection and his second selection in a row as a starter.

On February 13, 2024, Tatum put up 41 points, 31 of them in the first half—tying his career high for points scored in a first half—14 rebounds, five assists, and five three-pointers in a 118–110 victory over the Brooklyn Nets. He also joined Larry Bird as the only players in Celtics franchise history to put up at least 25 40-point games. On March 9, Tatum and Brown combined for 56 points in a 117–107 victory over the Phoenix Suns; Tatum became the third Celtic to record 1,000 three-pointers, joining Paul Pierce and teammate Brown. The Celtics finished the regular season with the NBA's top seed and home-court advantage throughout the postseason for the first time since 2007–08.

Tatum holding Larry O'Brien Championship Trophy before the parade.

On April 21, in Game 1 of the Celtics' first round playoff series against the Miami Heat, Tatum notched his first career playoff triple-double with 23 points, 10 rebounds, and 10 assists in a 114–94 victory. In Game 1 of the Eastern Conference Finals against the Indiana Pacers on May 21, Tatum scored 36 points, including 10 in overtime, along with 12 rebounds, four assists, and three steals in a 133–128 victory. Four days later in Game 3, he had 36 points again during a 114–111 comeback victory. The Celtics won the series in four games and advanced to the 2024 NBA Finals. Tatum became the sixth player in NBA history after Tim Duncan, Jason Kidd, LeBron James, Nikola Jokić, and Luka Dončić to lead their team in points, rebounds, and assists while reaching the NBA Finals.

In Game 2 of the 2024 NBA Finals against the Dallas Mavericks on June 9, Tatum recorded a near triple-double with 18 points, 12 assists, and nine rebounds in a 105–98 victory. Three days later in Game 3, he had 31 points, six rebounds, and five assists in 106–99 victory. Tatum and Jaylen Brown became the first Celtics duo to each post at least 30/5/5 in an NBA Finals game. In doing so, they also surpassed Larry Bird and Kevin McHale for the most 25-point games as a Celtics duo in playoff history. The Celtics went on to win the series in five games, with Tatum recording 31 points, 11 assists, and eight rebounds during the 106–88 close-out victory in Game 5 on June 17. Tatum became the sixth player to lead his team in points, rebounds and assists during a championship run. The only other players to do this were Nikola Jokić, LeBron James, Tim Duncan, Hakeem Olajuwon and Larry Bird. Tatum also led the Celtics in all three categories during the NBA Finals.

==== 2024–25 season: Record-breaking extension and season ending Achilles rupture ====
On July 1, 2024, Tatum signed a five-year contract extension worth up to $314 million, surpassing his superstar teammate Jaylen Brown's $304 million extension as the richest deal in NBA history.

On November 16, 2024, Tatum put up 24 points, 11 rebounds, and nine assists, alongside a buzzer-beating, game-winning three-pointer in a 126–123 overtime win over the Toronto Raptors. On December 21, Tatum scored a season-high 43 points along with 15 rebounds and 10 assists in a 123–98 win over the Chicago Bulls. He became just the fifth player in NBA history to record 40+ points, 15+ rebounds, 10+ assists and 5+ 3s in a game, joining James Harden (2x), DeMarcus Cousins, Russell Westbrook and Vince Carter. Tatum is also the first player in Celtics history to record 40+ points, 15+ boards and 10+ dimes in a game. He also joined Larry Bird as the only Celtics with 40-point triple-doubles.

On January 25, 2025, Tatum was named an Eastern Conference starter for the 2025 NBA All-Star Game, marking his sixth consecutive selection and his third selection in a row as a starter. On February 20, Tatum put up his fourth career triple-double with 15 points, 11 rebounds, and 10 assists in a 124–104 win. On February 28, Tatum recorded season-highs with 46 points and 16 rebounds along with nine assists and three blocks in a 123–116 loss against the Cleveland Cavaliers. He had 30 points, nine rebounds and seven assists in the opening 24 minutes, the first player ever to reach those totals in a half since the play-by-play era.

On April 29, in Game 5 of the first round of the playoffs, Tatum scored 35 points on 10-for-16 shooting, 4-for-5 from 3-point range and a perfect 11-for-11 from the free-throw line, to go along with eight rebounds and 10 assists in a 120–89 close-out win over the Orlando Magic. Tatum became the first player in NBA history to make 10-plus free throws without a miss in three consecutive playoff games. He went 37 for 37 at the free throw line over a three-game span and missed just four free throws in the entire five-game series (37-for-41). He also had three straight playoff games with 35-plus points to become only the second Celtics' player to accomplish that feat, joining Larry Bird. On May 12, in Game 4 of the second round of the playoffs, Tatum scored 42 points, along with eight rebounds, four assists, four steals, and two blocks, in a 121–113 loss to the New York Knicks. He also tied Larry Bird and John Havlicek for the most 40-point playoff games in Celtics franchise history with five. However, in the final minutes of the fourth quarter, Tatum suffered a ruptured Achilles tendon. He had surgery to repair it the next day, and was sidelined for the rest of the playoffs, which ended in a 119–81 loss in Game 6.

==== 2025–26 season: Recovery from injury ====
Ten months after rupturing his Achilles, Tatum returned and made his 2025–26 season debut on March 6, 2026, against the Dallas Mavericks, in which he recorded 15 points along with 12 rebounds and seven assists in a 120–100 win. On April 1, Tatum notched his fifth career triple-double with 25 points, 18 rebounds, and 11 assists in a 147–129 win over the Miami Heat.

In the playoffs, Tatum averaged 23.3 points, 10.7 rebounds, and a playoff career-high 6.8 assists per game. The Celtics were eliminated in the Eastern Conference First Round by the Philadelphia 76ers after a hard-fought seven-game series. Tatum missed Game 7 due to left knee stiffness, and the Celtics fell 109–100 to the 76ers.

==== 2026–27 season: End of the "Jays" ====
On July 6, 2026, Tatum’s All-NBA teammate Jaylen Brown was traded to the Philadelphia 76ers, marking the end of the duo known as the "Jays".

On October 27, 2026, Tatum recorded 40 points, five rebounds, and eight assists, alongside a buzzer-beating game-winner in the 124–123 overtime win over the Brooklyn Nets. He joined Larry Bird as the only players in Celtics history to score at least 40 points and hit a buzzer-beater in the same game. He also became first player in NBA history to score at least 40 points and a game-winning buzzer-beater in a game before November.

== National team career ==
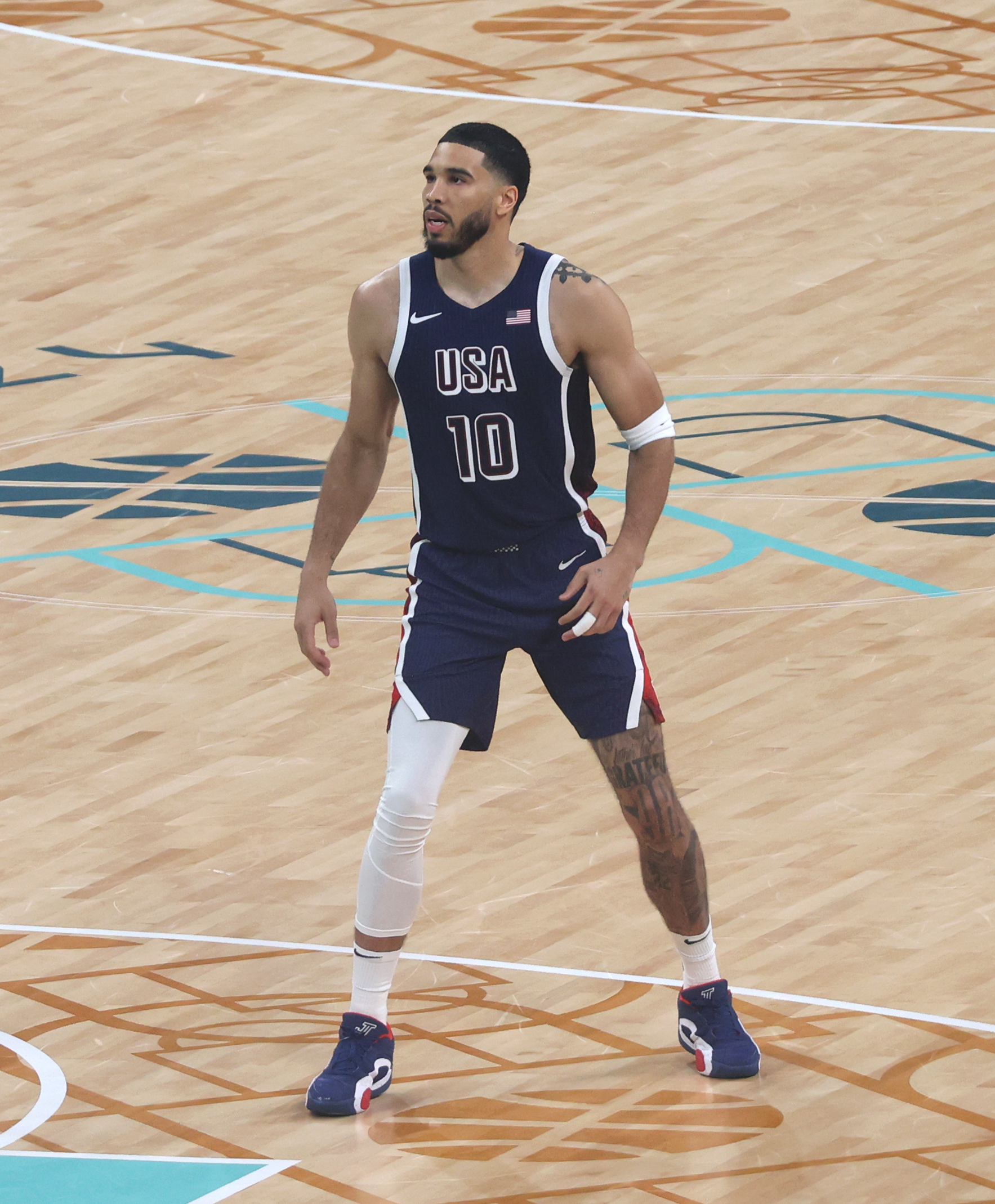
Tatum playing for the U.S. national team in the 2024 Summer Olympics

Tatum played in the 2014 FIBA Under-17 World Championship and 2015 FIBA Under-19 World Championship, making the Eurobasket.com All-World Championship U19 Second Team.

Representing Team USA at the 2016 Nike Hoop Summit, Tatum saw 16 minutes, 57 seconds of action, recording 14 points, four rebounds, two assists, two steals, and a block.

Tatum was named to the 2020 Olympic team, which did not play in Tokyo until 2021 due to the COVID-19 pandemic. He helped Team USA win the gold medal, averaging 15.2 points, 3.3 rebounds, 1.2 assists, 0.5 steals, and 1.2 blocks while shooting 49.3% from the field in six games. Tatum was the second highest scorer on the team to Kevin Durant. He was also named to the 2024 Olympic team. Team USA would go on to win the gold medal in a rematch against France, though Tatum only averaged 5.3 points, 5.3 rebounds, and 1.5 assists throughout the games. His lack of playing time raised questions as he was coming off of a championship run with the Celtics.

== Awards and honors ==
NBA

- NBA champion: 2024
- 6× NBA All-Star: 2020–2025
- NBA All-Star Game MVP: 2023
- 5x All-NBA Team selections:
  - 4× All-NBA First Team: 2022–2025
  - All-NBA Third Team: 2020
- NBA All-Rookie First Team: 2018
- NBA Eastern Conference Finals MVP: 2022

USA Basketball

- 2x Olympics gold medalist: 2020, 2024
- FIBA Under-19 World Cup gold medalist: 2019
- FIBA U17 World Championship gold medalist: 2014

== Career statistics ==
Legend
| GP | Games played | GS | Games started | MPG | Minutes per game |
| FG% | Field goal percentage | 3P% | 3-point field goal percentage | FT% | Free throw percentage |
| RPG | Rebounds per game | APG | Assists per game | SPG | Steals per game |
| BPG | Blocks per game | PPG | Points per game | **Bold** | Career high |
| † | Won an NBA championship | ‡ | NBA record |

=== NBA ===
==== Regular season ====
| Year | Team | GP | GS | MPG | FG% | 3P% | FT% | RPG | APG | SPG | BPG | PPG |
|---|---|---|---|---|---|---|---|---|---|---|---|---|
| 2017–18 | Boston | **80** | **80** | 30.5 | **.475** | **.434** | .826 | 5.0 | 1.6 | 1.0 | .7 | 13.9 |
| 2018–19 | Boston | 79 | 79 | 31.1 | .450 | .373 | .855 | 6.0 | 2.1 | 1.1 | .7 | 15.7 |
| 2019–20 | Boston | 66 | 66 | 34.3 | .450 | .403 | .812 | 7.0 | 3.0 | **1.4** | **.9** | 23.4 |
| 2020–21 | Boston | 64 | 64 | 35.8 | .459 | .386 | **.868** | 7.4 | 4.3 | 1.2 | .5 | 26.4 |
| 2021–22 | Boston | 76 | 76 | 35.9 | .453 | .353 | .853 | 8.0 | 4.4 | 1.0 | .6 | 26.9 |
| 2022–23 | Boston | 74 | 74 | **36.9** | .466 | .350 | .854 | 8.8 | 4.6 | 1.1 | .7 | **30.1** |
| 2023–24† | Boston | 74 | 74 | 35.7 | .471 | .376 | .833 | 8.1 | 4.9 | 1.0 | .6 | 26.9 |
| 2024–25 | Boston | 72 | 72 | 36.4 | .452 | .343 | .814 | 8.7 | **6.0** | 1.1 | .5 | 26.8 |
| 2025–26 | Boston | 16 | 16 | 32.6 | .411 | .329 | .823 | **10.0** | 5.3 | **1.4** | .2 | 21.8 |
| Career | | 601 | 601 | 34.4 | .458 | .368 | .839 | 7.4 | 3.9 | 1.1 | .6 | 23.5 |
| All-Star | | 6 | 5 | 21.5 | .618 | .408 | .500 | 4.5 | 4.7 | 1.7 | .5 | 21.8 |

==== Playoffs ====
| Year | Team | GP | GS | MPG | FG% | 3P% | FT% | RPG | APG | SPG | BPG | PPG |
|---|---|---|---|---|---|---|---|---|---|---|---|---|
| 2018 | Boston | 19 | 19 | 35.9 | .471 | .324 | .845 | 4.4 | 2.7 | 1.2 | .5 | 18.5 |
| 2019 | Boston | 9 | 9 | 32.8 | .438 | .323 | .744 | 6.7 | 1.9 | 1.1 | .8 | 15.2 |
| 2020 | Boston | 17 | 17 | 40.6 | .434 | .373 | .813 | 10.0 | 5.0 | 1.0 | 1.2 | 25.7 |
| 2021 | Boston | 5 | 5 | 37.0 | .423 | .389 | **.918** | 5.8 | 4.6 | 1.2 | **1.6** | **30.6** |
| 2022 | Boston | **24** | **24** | **41.0** | .426 | **.393** | .800 | 6.7 | 6.2 | 1.2 | .9 | 25.6 |
| 2023 | Boston | 20 | 20 | 40.0 | .458 | .323 | .876 | 10.5 | 5.3 | 1.1 | 1.1 | 27.2 |
| 2024† | Boston | 19 | 19 | 40.4 | .427 | .283 | .861 | 9.7 | 6.3 | 1.1 | .7 | 25.0 |
| 2025 | Boston | 8 | 8 | 40.3 | .423 | .372 | .889 | **11.5** | 5.4 | **2.1** | .8 | 28.1 |
| 2026 | Boston | 6 | 6 | 36.3 | **.475** | .365 | .781 | 10.7 | **6.8** | 1.2 | .0 | 23.3 |
| Career | | 127 | 127 | 38.9 | .440 | .349 | .839 | 8.3 | 5.0 | 1.2 | .8 | 24.2 |

=== College ===
| Year | Team | GP | GS | MPG | FG% | 3P% | FT% | RPG | APG | SPG | BPG | PPG |
|---|---|---|---|---|---|---|---|---|---|---|---|---|
| 2016–17 | Duke | 29 | 27 | 33.3 | .452 | .342 | .849 | 7.3 | 2.1 | 1.3 | 1.1 | 16.8 |

== NBA achievements ==
=== Regular season ===
- Became 1 of 3 players to score 60+ points without committing a turnover
- Led entire NBA in plus-minus in 2022
- Led entire NBA in total points in 2023

=== Playoffs ===
- Most points in a game 7 with 51
- Most assists in a Finals debut with 13
- Most playoff points by a player before turning 27
- Second most playoff rebounds by a player before turning 27 (behind Bill Russell)
- One of 6 players to lead a champion in total points, rebounds, and assists in their playoff run alongside Nikola Jokić, Hakeem Olajuwon, Tim Duncan, LeBron James, and Larry Bird
  - Tatum is the youngest and shortest player to accomplish this
- One of two players to lead both teams in a playoff series in total points, rebounds, assists, steals, and blocks alongside LeBron James
- Tied with LeBron James (2018) for most 30-point, 10-rebound and 5-assist games in a single playoff run with 7 such games in 2023.
- One of 6 players to lead team in points, rebounds, and assists in a finals series alongside Luka Dončić, Magic Johnson, Tim Duncan, LeBron James, and Larry Bird
- Recorded two 50+ point playoff games. Only Michael Jordan, Wilt Chamberlain, Allen Iverson, and Donovan Mitchell have recorded more.
- Scored 25+ points in a half in a playoff game 10 times. Since play-by-play started in 1997, only LeBron James (21), Kobe Bryant (17), Kevin Durant (12), and Donovan Mitchell (11) have done it more.
- One of two players with 50+ points and 0 turnovers in a playoff game
- Youngest player to score 25+ points in a playoff game
- Scored second most playoff points by a player in their rookie year behind Kareem Abdul-Jabbar
- Most points in a single play-in tournament game with 50

== Personal life ==
Tatum is the son of Justin Tatum and Brandy Cole-Barnes. His father is a former professional basketball player and the current head coach of the Illawarra Hawks in the Australian NBL. His mother was an 18-year-old freshman in college on a volleyball scholarship when Tatum was born. Cole-Barnes raised Tatum as a single mother. She earned degrees in communications and political science and graduated from law school. Cole-Barnes also earned her Master of Business Administration.

Tatum's son, Jayson Jr. (commonly nicknamed "Deuce"), was born in 2017. Tatum resides in Newton, Massachusetts, where he purchased a mansion in 2019. In 2024, Tatum and singer-songwriter Ella Mai had his second son, their first together, Dylan.

Tatum is the godson of former NBA player Larry Hughes, who was his father's high school and college teammate. Tatum is also a cousin of former NBA player and current Los Angeles Clippers head coach Tyronn Lue.

While in high school at Chaminade College Preparatory School, Tatum became friends with future NHL forward Matthew Tkachuk of the Florida Panthers, as the two were placed in the same gym class. Both Tatum and Tkachuk won their respective championship series (the 2024 NBA Finals and 2024 Stanley Cup Final, respectively) within a week of each other. Tatum is also friends with former Duke teammate and former NBA player Harry Giles.

Tatum is a Christian, crediting Jesus for his career success. Tatum has several tattoos showcasing his Christian faith. Tatum runs the Jayson Tatum Foundation, which aims to help low-income families build generational wealth. The foundation is particularly active in Tatum's hometown of St. Louis.

== Off the court ==
=== Duke University ===
In October 2025, Tatum was named the Chief Basketball Officer for Duke Blue Devils men's basketball. In this position, he would volunteer his time as a special advisor to Jon Scheyer and the Duke University program.

=== Endorsements ===
As of 2017, Tatum is a spokesperson for Imo's Pizza. On June 21, 2019, he signed with the Jordan Brand, and in 2023, Tatum received his own signature silhouette, the Jordan Tatum 1. Tatum is also endorsed by Subway and Gatorade.

In February 2024, Tatum partnered with the financial services company SoFi to help people buy homes in his hometown of St. Louis. The company donated $1 million to the Jayson Tatum Foundation for the initiative. That same month, Tatum appeared on CBS News to discuss their efforts to boost home ownership and financial literacy. He claims that growing up in a "single-parent household" made him more passionate about personal finance. In July 2024, Tatum was named the cover athlete for the video game NBA 2K25.

== See also ==
- List of NBA career 3-point scoring leaders
- List of NBA career playoff 3-point scoring leaders
- List of NBA single-game scoring leaders
- List of NBA single-game playoff scoring leaders
