= Bishop Borgess High School =

Coordinates: 42°22′21.4″N 83°16′22.2″W

Location
- 11685 Appleton Ave; Redford, Michigan; US

Information
- Type: Private, Coeducational
- Religious affiliation: Roman Catholic
- Established: 1966
- Closed: 2005
- Grades: 9–12
- Enrollment: 1,912 (1978)
- Colors: Green, white, and gold
- Nickname: Spartans
- Newspaper: The Harbinger
- Yearbook: The Labrynth

Bishop Borgess High School was a Catholic secondary school in the Detroit suburb of Redford, Michigan. Named after Caspar Henry Borgess, the second Roman Catholic bishop of Detroit, it was founded by the parishes of St. Suzanne (in Detroit), Our Lady of Grace (Dearborn Heights), and St. Hilary (Redford). Later contributing parishes included St. Monica (Detroit), St. Robert Bellarmine (Redford), St. Gemma (Detroit)., St. Valentine (Redford), Christ the King (Detroit), St. Scholastica (Detroit), St. Thomas Aquinas (Detroit), and St. Gerard (Detroit).

When the school opened in September 1966, it had 317 students. During the 1970s, Bishop Borgess was the largest coeducational Catholic high school in Michigan, with a peak enrollment of 1,912 in 1978. Soon after reaching this peak, the demographics of northwest Detroit began to change and enrollment began decreasing. The Archdiocese of Detroit closed the school in 2005. Today, the school is a part of Cornerstone Schools under the name, Washington-Parks Academy.

== Sports ==
Like Michigan State University, the school colors were green and white (also gold), and sports teams were known as the Spartans. Boys had teams for football, baseball, basketball, track, cross-country, soccer, and tennis. Girls had teams for softball, swimming, basketball, track and volleyball. The school was a member of Detroit's Catholic High School League and the Michigan High School Athletic Association (MHSAA).

Bishop Borgess is most known for its Girls Basketball team, which won three State Championships (1993, 1995 and 1997). It is one of only five schools in Michigan history to have two Miss Basketball award winners from their school: Maxann Reese (1995) and Aiysha Smith (1997). Maxann Reese was a first-team All-Big Ten player at Michigan State and went on to play in the WNBA. Aiysha Smith played at St. John's and LSU and also played in the WNBA. The Girls Basketball coach Dave Mann received multiple Coach of the Year awards during his 11 years at Bishop Borgess.

In 1997, the boys basketball team made history by winning the school's first ever Boys State Championship, coached by Roosevelt Barnes in only his second year as head coach. The following year, the boys basketball team won the Catholic League Championship but lost to Detroit Cass Tech in the City Championship game at Calihan Hall by the score of 73–68. The Spartans fell short of a back-to-back state title and were eliminated from the State playoffs in the Regional finals to eventual State Champion St. Martin DePorres. Bishop Borgess was led in both years by Aaron "A.J" Jessup and Sam Hoskin, who both went on to have successful Division I college basketball careers.

== Activities ==
The school newspaper was the Harbinger. The annual yearbook was the Labyrinth. Dramatic plays were staged each fall, and musical productions in the spring. Other activities included debate, forensics (state champions in 1982 and 1984), language clubs, band, choir and student government council.

== Notable alumni ==
- Saul Anuzis - politician
- Sam Hoskin - professional basketball player
- John Jaszcz - audio engineer and record producer
- Aaron "A.J." Jessup - NCAA Division I basketball player
- Maxann Reese - professional basketball player
- Shawn Respert - NBA basketball player
- Aiysha Smith - professional basketball player
