= Aiysha Smith =

American basketball player (born 1980)

Personal information
- Born: July 18, 1980 (age 46) Detroit, Michigan, U.S.
- Listed height: 6 ft 2 in (1.88 m)
- Listed weight: 173 lb (78 kg)

Career information
- High school: Bishop Borgess (Detroit, Michigan)
- College: St. John's (1999–2000); Tyler JC (2000–2001); LSU (2001–2003)
- WNBA draft: 2003: 1st round, 7th overall pick
- Drafted by: Washington Mystics
- Position: Forward
- Number: 31

Career history
- 2003–2004: Washington Mystics

Career highlights
- First-team All-SEC (2002)
- Stats at Basketball Reference
Medals
Women's basketball
Representing United States
World University Games
Gold medal – first place	2001 Beijing	Team competition

Aiysha Kenya Smith (born July 18, 1980) is an American former professional basketball player who spent her career for the Washington Mystics of the WNBA. She was drafted by the Mystics (seventh overall) in the 2003 WNBA draft.

== High school ==
Smith attended Bishop Borgess High School in Detroit, Michigan.

== College ==
At Tyler Junior College, Smith was a member of the Kodak All-America First Team (2001) and NCJCAA All-America (2001). At LSU she was a member of the All-SEC First Team (2002) and All-SEC honorable mention (2003)

== Career statistics ==
=== WNBA ===
==== Regular season ====
Year	Team	GP	GS	MPG	FG%	3P%	FT%	RPG	APG	SPG	BPG	TO	PPG
2003	Washington	**31**	2	13.6	34.2	14.7	50.0	2.1	0.3	0.4	0.3	0.8	3.4
2004	Washington	29	**3**	**13.9**	**40.8**	**56.3**	**64.7**	**2.4**	**0.5**	**0.6**	**0.4**	**0.7**	**4.0**
Career	2 years, 1 team	60	5	13.8	37.2	28.0	57.4	2.2	0.4	0.5	0.4	0.8	3.7

==== Playoffs ====
Year	Team	GP	GS	MPG	FG%	3P%	FT%	RPG	APG	SPG	BPG	TO	PPG
2004	Washington	3	0	17.7	33.3	25.0	80.0	2.7	0.3	0.3	0.0	1.3	5.0
Career	1 year, 1 team	3	0	17.7	33.3	25.0	80.0	2.7	0.3	0.3	0.0	1.3	5.0

=== College ===
Legend
GP	Games played	GS	Games started	MPG	Minutes per game
FG%	Field goal percentage	3P%	3-point field goal percentage	FT%	Free throw percentage
RPG	Rebounds per game	APG	Assists per game	SPG	Steals per game
BPG	Blocks per game	PPG	Points per game	**Bold**	Career high

Year	Team	GP	Points	FG%	3P%	FT%	RPG	APG	SPG	BPG	PPG
1999-00	St. John's	29	276	37.9%	13.3%	76.5%	7.1	1.7	0.9	0.8	9.5
2000–01	Tyler JC										
2001-02	LSU	30	**476**	**51.1%**	10.0%	75.2%	**7.7**	1.1	**1.9**	0.8	**15.9**
2002-03	LSU	**34**	449	46.8%	**25.9%**	**77.1%**	5.6	1.1	1.1	**1.0**	13.2
Career		93	1201	45.9%	21.5%	76.2%	6.7	1.3	1.3	0.9	12.9

== WNBA ==
Smith played two seasons for the Mystics, playing in sixty games and starting five.

== International competition ==
Smith was an alternate on Team USA in the 2001 World University Games.

== Personal life ==
Smith is married to former NFL defensive end Marcus Spears. The couple have three children: Macaria Reagan Spears (born 2007), Marcus Rayshon Spears, Jr. (born 2009), and Miko Reign Spears (born 2013).
