= Tori Jankoska =

American basketball player

Free agent
- Position: Guard

Personal information
- Born: September 16, 1994 (age 32) Saginaw, Michigan, U.S.
- Listed height: 5 ft 8 in (1.73 m)

Career information
- High school: Freeland (Freeland, Michigan)
- College: Michigan State (2013–2017)
- WNBA draft: 2017: 1st round, 9th overall pick
- Drafted by: Chicago Sky
- Playing career: 2017–present

Career highlights
- First-team All-Big Ten (2017); Michigan Miss Basketball (2013)
- Stats at WNBA.com
- Stats at Basketball Reference

Tori Jankoska (born September 16, 1994) is an American professional women's basketball player. She was drafted with the ninth overall pick in the 2017 WNBA draft by the Chicago Sky. In May 2017, Jankoska was waived by the Sky after the team's season opener. In June 2017 Jankoska signed to play for the Polish team Basket Gdynia for the 2017–2018 season.

Jankoska is Michigan State's all-time leader in points scored, three point shots made, field goals made and second all time in assists.

== Michigan State statistics ==
Legend
| GP | Games played | GS | Games started | MPG | Minutes per game |
| FG% | Field goal percentage | 3P% | 3-point field goal percentage | FT% | Free throw percentage |
| RPG | Rebounds per game | APG | Assists per game | SPG | Steals per game |
| BPG | Blocks per game | PPG | Points per game | **Bold** | Career high |

| Year | Team | GP | Points | FG% | 3P% | FT% | RPG | APG | SPG | BPG | PPG |
|---|---|---|---|---|---|---|---|---|---|---|---|
| 2013–14 | Michigan State | 33 | 408 | 40.9% | 36.0% | 76.2% | 3.1 | 2.4 | 1.2 | 0.3 | 12.4 |
| 2014–15 | Michigan State | 31 | 543 | 41.3% | 36.8% | 75.4% | 6.9 | 3.9 | 1.4 | 0.4 | 17.5 |
| 2015–16 | Michigan State | **34** | 515 | 38.6% | 29.7% | 87.7% | 5.4 | 3.8 | 1.6 | **0.5** | 15.1 |
| 2016–17 | Michigan State | 33 | **746** | **44.5%** | **38.4%** | **91.0%** | **8.0** | **4.8** | **1.7** | 0.4 | **22.6** |
| Career | | 131 | 2,212 | 41.6% | 35.4% | 82.7% | 5.8 | 3.7 | 1.5 | 0.4 | 16.9 |
