= Michigan Miss Basketball =

Michigan basketball award

The Michigan Miss Basketball award is given annually since 1981 to the best female high school senior basketball player in the U.S. state of Michigan. It is awarded by the Basketball Coaches Association of Michigan (BCAM) in conjunction with the Detroit Free Press. Points are awarded on a 5-3-1 basis and only active coaches who are BCAM members are permitted to vote.

== Award winners ==
Year	Player	High School	College	Professional/WNBA draft
1981	Julie Polakowski	Leland	Michigan State	
1982	Sue Tucker	Okemos	Michigan State	
1983	Michele Kruty	Manistee	Dayton	
1984	Emily Wagner	Livonia Ladywood	Stanford	
1985	Franthea Price	River Rouge	Iowa	
1986	Daedra Charles	Detroit de Porres	Tennessee	
1987	Dena Head	Plymouth Salem	Tennessee	1997 Elite Draft: 1st Rnd, 1st overall by the Utah Starzz
1988	Jennifer Shasky	Birmingham Marian	George Washington	
1989	Peggy Evans	Detroit Country Day	Tennessee / Ohio State	
1990	Markita Aldridge	Detroit King	NC-Charlotte	
1991	Lisa Negri	Flint Powers	Ohio State	
1992	Erinn Reed	Saginaw	Iowa / Kansas	
1993	Sally Sedlar	Manistee	Toledo / Central Michigan	
1994	Kim Knuth	St. Joseph	Toledo	
1995	Maxann Reese	Bishop Borgess	Michigan State	
1996	Deanna Nolan	Flint Northern	Georgia	2001 WNBA draft: 1st Rnd, 6th overall by the Detroit Shock
1997	Aiysha Smith	Bishop Borgess	St. John's / LSU	
1998	Kristen Koetsier	Grandville	Western Michigan	
1999	Vicki Krapohl	Mount Pleasant	Duke	
2000	Tabitha Pool	Ann Arbor Huron	Michigan	
2001	Liz Shimek	Maple City Glen Lake	Michigan State	2006 WNBA draft: 2nd Rnd, 18th overall by the Phoenix Mercury
2002	Danielle Kamm	Saginaw Nouvel	Marquette	
2003	Krista Clement	St. Ignace La Salle	Michigan	
2004	Tiffanie Shives	Lansing Christian	Michigan State / Gonzaga	
2005	Allyssa DeHaan	Grandville	Michigan State	
2006	Brenna Banktson	Frankfort	Western Michigan	
2007	No award given *			
2008	Kellie Watson	Ionia	Notre Dame / Grand Valley State	
2009	Jenny Ryan	Saginaw Nouvel	Michigan	
2010	Klarissa Bell	East Lansing	Michigan State	
2011	Jasmine Hines	Central Lake	Michigan State	
2012	Madison Ristovski	Grosse Pointe Woods University Liggett	Michigan	
2013	Tori Jankoska	Freeland	Michigan State	2017 WNBA draft, Chicago Sky (Round: 1 / Pick: 9)
2014	Lexi Gussert	Forest Park	Michigan State	
2015	Tania Davis	Goodrich	Iowa	
2016	Kysre Gondrezick	Benton Harbor	Michigan / West Virginia	2021 WNBA draft: 1st Rnd, 4th overall by the Indiana Fever
2017	Jordan Walker	Mona Shores	Western Michigan	
2018	Jaida Hampton	East Lansing	Wichita State	
2019	Rickea Jackson	Detroit Edison	Mississippi State	2024 WNBA draft: 1st Rnd, 4th overall by the Los Angeles Sparks
2020	Gabrielle Elliot	Detroit Edison	Clemson	
2021	Damiya Hagemann	Detroit Edison	Michigan State	
2022	Ruby Whitehorn	Detroit Edison	Clemson	
2023	Macy Brown	East Grand Rapids	Michigan	
2024	Gabby Reynolds	Holland West Ottawa	George Washington	
2025	Anna Wypych	Rockford	Butler	
2026	Lilly Williams	Howell	Michigan State	

* Through 2006, girls basketball was a fall sport. Beginning in 2007, the sport was moved to the winter with seasons beginning in one calendar year and ending in the following year. Thus, no award was given in 2007 although the honor has been awarded annually since 1981. The 2006 award covered the 2006–2007 school year while the 2007–2008 school year was covered with the 2008 award.

== See also ==
- Mr. Basketball of Michigan
