= Jaylen Brown =

American basketball player (born 1996)

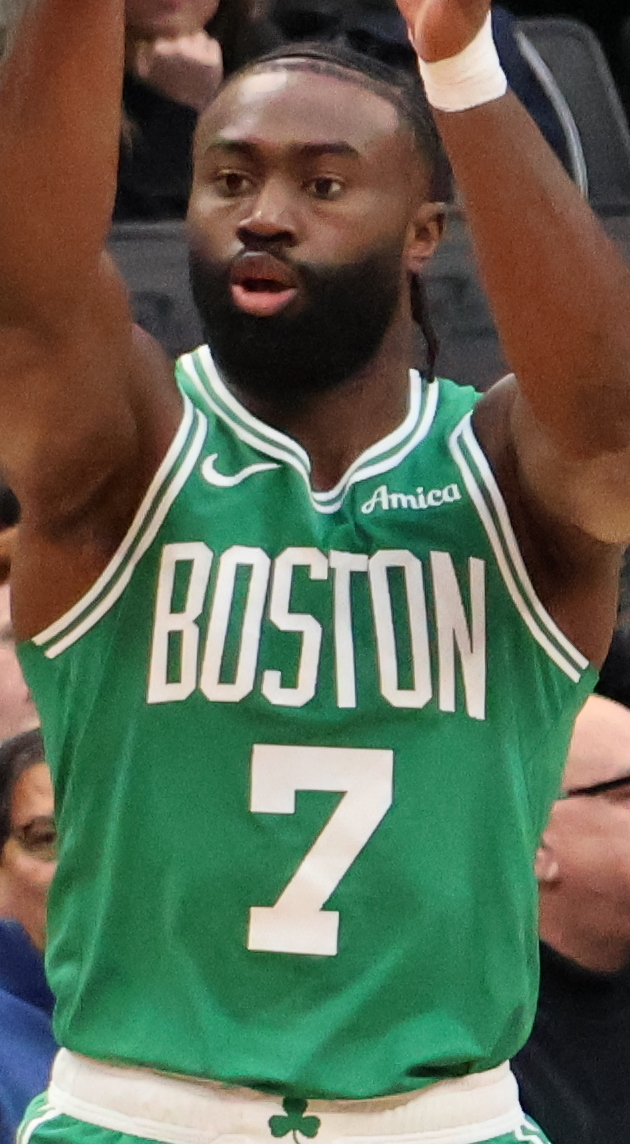
- Brown with the Boston Celtics in 2024

No. 7 – Philadelphia 76ers
- Position: Small forward / shooting guard
- League: NBA

Personal information
- Born: October 24, 1996 (age 30) Marietta, Georgia, U.S.
- Listed height: 6 ft 6 in (1.98 m)
- Listed weight: 223 lb (101 kg)

Career information
- High school: Wheeler (Marietta, Georgia)
- College: California (2015–2016)
- NBA draft: 2016: 1st round, 3rd overall pick
- Drafted by: Boston Celtics
- Playing career: 2016–present

Career history
- 2016–2026: Boston Celtics
- 2026–present: Philadelphia 76ers

Career highlights
- NBA champion (2024); NBA Finals MVP (2024); 5× NBA All-Star (2021, 2023–2026); 2× All-NBA Second Team (2023, 2026); NBA Eastern Conference finals MVP (2024); NBA All-Rookie Second Team (2017); First-team All-Pac-12 (2016); Pac-12 Freshman of the Year (2016); McDonald's All-American (2015); First-team Parade All-American (2015); Mr. Georgia Basketball (2015)
- Stats at NBA.com
- Stats at Basketball Reference
Medals
Men's basketball
Representing the United States
FIBA Americas U18 Championship
Gold medal – first place	2014 United States	National team

Jaylen Marselles Brown (born October 24, 1996) is an American professional basketball player for the Philadelphia 76ers of the National Basketball Association (NBA). He played one year of college basketball for the California Golden Bears and was named first-team all-conference and Freshman of the Year in the Pac-12 Conference. Declaring for the 2016 NBA draft after his freshman season, Brown was selected by the Boston Celtics with the third overall pick. As a professional, he has split his time between shooting guard and small forward.

Brown is a five-time NBA All-Star, a two-time All-NBA Team member, and reached the Eastern Conference finals six times with Boston. He helped the Celtics reach the 2022 and 2024 NBA Finals, winning a championship and the Finals MVP award in the latter. Brown and Jayson Tatum made up the Celtics' "Jays" duo from 2017 to 2026. He was traded by the Celtics to the Philadelphia 76ers in July 2026.

== High school career ==
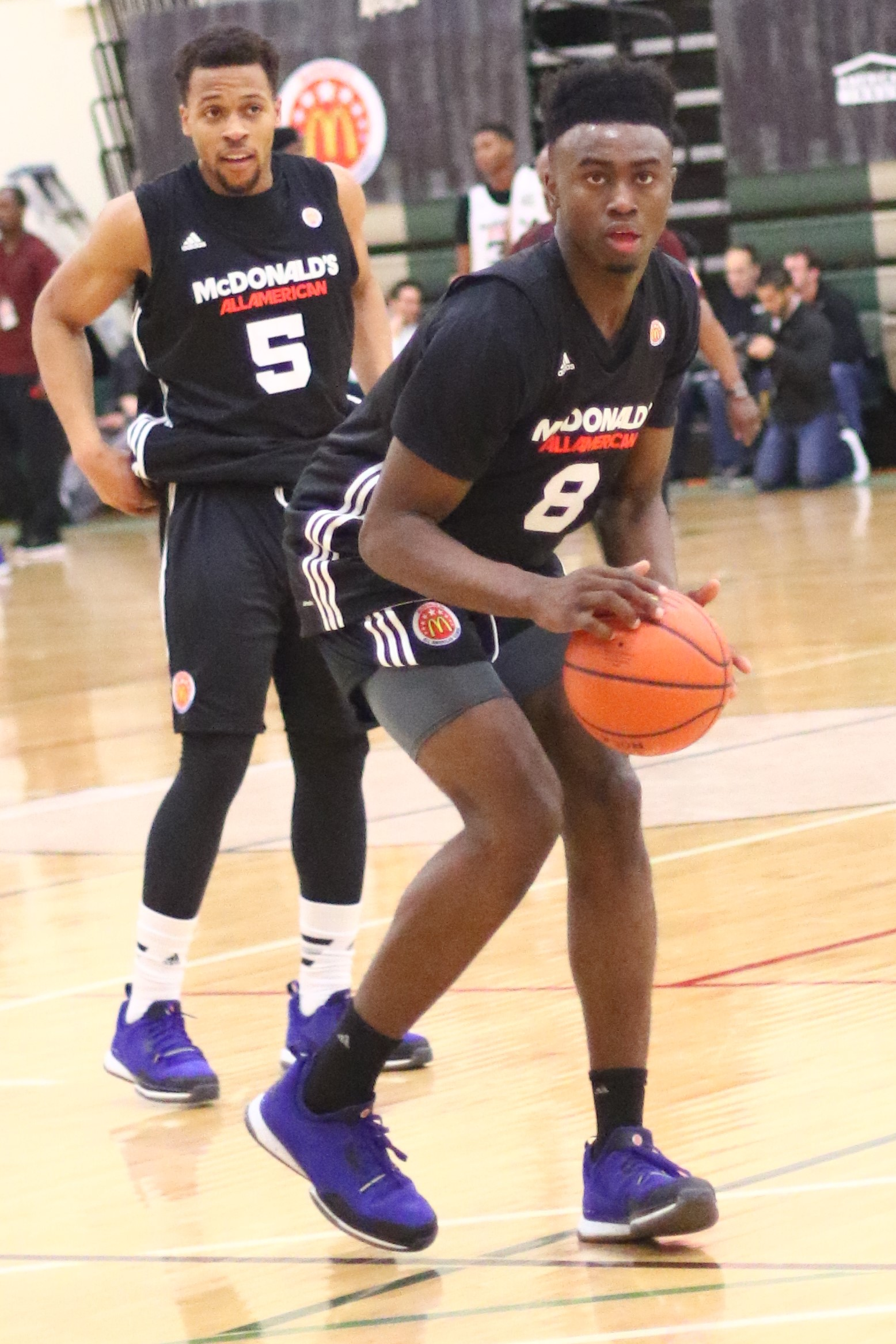
Brown in March 2015

Brown attended Wheeler High School in his hometown of Marietta, Georgia. As a junior, Brown averaged 24.1 points, 8.2 rebounds, 4.1 assists, and 2.0 steals per game while leading the Wildcats to a 29–5 overall record.

As a senior, Brown helped lead his team to victory in the Georgia High School Association Class 6A State Championship. With 0.6 seconds remaining, Brown hit two free throws to give Wheeler a 59–58 win. More highlights of Brown's senior season included 28 points and 11 rebounds in a 76–70 victory over Harry Giles and Wesleyan Christian Academy; a 24-point and eight rebound performance in a 61–40 victory over Malik Monk and Bentonville High School; 25 points, 12 rebounds, and six assists in a 75–65 victory over Ben Simmons and Montverde Academy; and 29 points and 15 rebounds against Huntington Prep. As a senior, Brown averaged 28 points and 12 rebounds while leading Wheeler to a 30–3 overall record.

Brown won a 2014 FIBA Americas Championship gold medal as part of the USA Basketball Men's U18 National Team. He was also selected to play in the 2015 McDonald's All-American Boys Game. At the end of his high school career, Brown was named Gatorade Georgia Boys Player of the Year, USA Today's All-USA Georgia Player of the Year, Georgia's Mr. Basketball, and the Class 6A Player of the Year.

=== Recruiting ===
Brown was rated a five-star recruit and ranked by Scout, ESPN, and 247Sports as the fourth best recruit in the class of 2015 behind Ben Simmons, Skal Labissière, and Brandon Ingram. Rivals ranked Brown third in his class.

On May 1, 2015, Brown committed to play for the Golden Bears at the University of California, Berkeley, under coach Cuonzo Martin and alongside fellow top recruit Ivan Rabb. Brown was heralded as an all-around prospect due to his athleticism.

College recruiting
Name	Hometown	School	Height	Weight	Commit date
Jaylen Brown; SF	Atlanta, GA	Wheeler (GA)	6 ft 7 in (2.01 m)	220 lb (100 kg)	May 1, 2015
Jaylen Brown; SF	Recruit ratings: Scout: Rivals: 247Sports: ESPN: (96)				
Overall recruit ranking: Scout: 4 Rivals: 3 247Sports: 4 ESPN: 4
Note: In many cases, Scout, Rivals, 247Sports, On3, and ESPN may conflict in their listings of height and weight.; In these cases, the average was taken. ESPN grades are on a 100-point scale.; Sources: "California 2015 Basketball Commitments". Rivals.; "2015 California Golden Bears Recruiting Class". ESPN.; "2015 Team Ranking". Rivals.

== College career ==
Brown took a master's-level class in Berkeley's Cultural Studies of Sport in Education program during his first semester in college. Brown also began learning Spanish, stating a goal of learning three additional languages by the age of 25.

While playing for the Golden Bears in 2015–16, Brown averaged 14.6 points, 5.4 rebounds, and 2.0 assists in 27.6 minutes per game over 34 games. He had his best scoring games on November 27, 2015, against Richmond and January 27, 2016, against Utah, recording 27 points in each game. Brown had a season-high 11 rebounds twice during victories on November 23, 2015, against Sam Houston State and on January 1, 2016, against Colorado. On January 23, 2016, he recorded a season-high seven assists to go along with 15 points in a narrow 74–73 victory over Arizona. Brown earned first-team All-Pac-12 honors and was named the Pac-12 Freshman of the Year.

== Professional career ==
=== Boston Celtics (2016–2026) ===
==== 2016–17 season: Rookie season ====
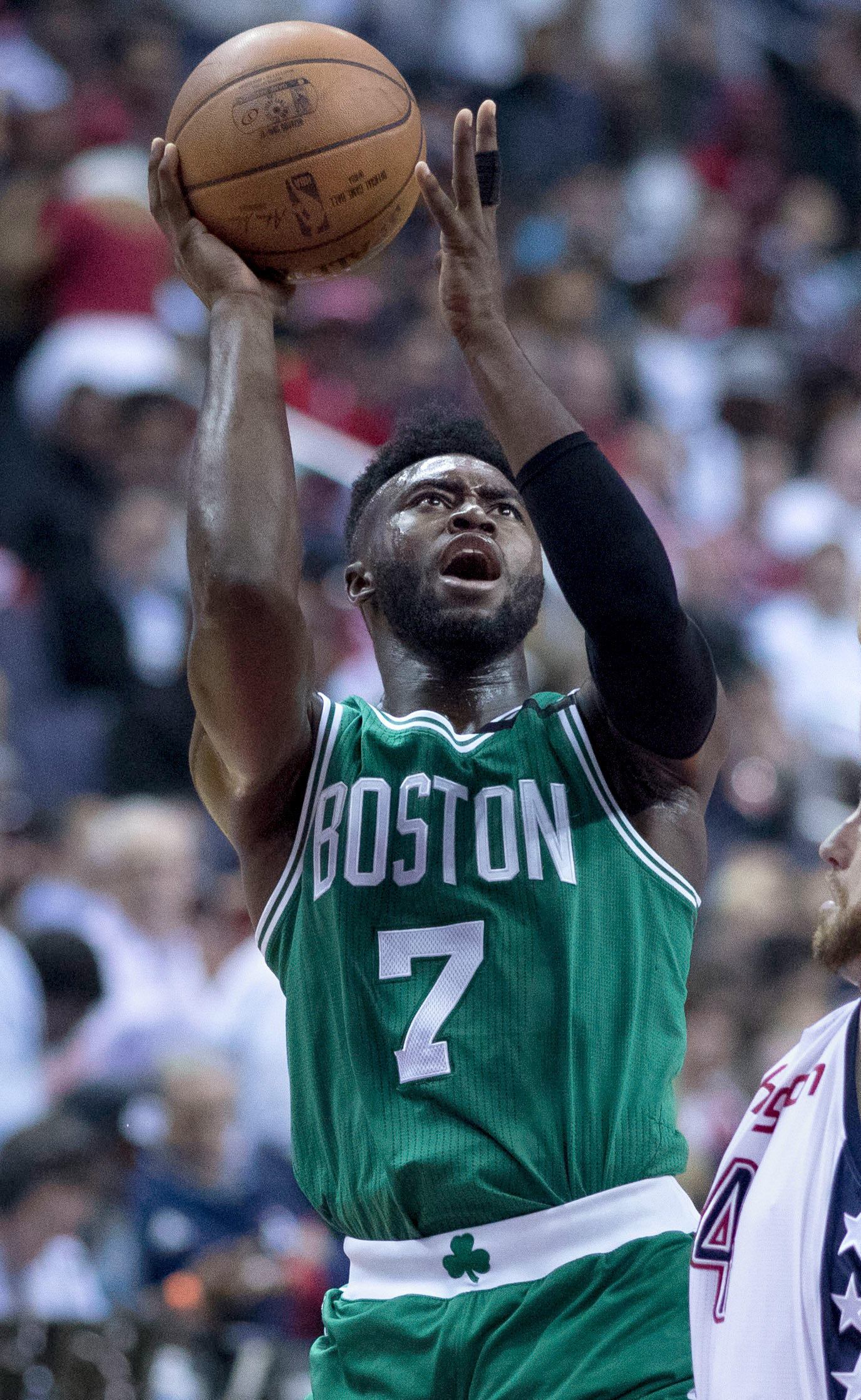
Brown in 2017

On June 23, 2016, Brown was selected by the Boston Celtics with the third overall pick in the 2016 NBA draft. On July 27, he signed his rookie scale contract with the Celtics after averaging 16.0 points, 6.2 rebounds and 2.3 steals in six Summer League games.

Brown made his debut for the Celtics on October 26, 2016, in the season-opening 122–117 victory over the Brooklyn Nets, scoring nine points on 3-for-4 shooting while also adding two blocks in 19-plus minutes. In his first career start on November 3, Brown scored 19 points in a 128–122 loss to the Cleveland Cavaliers. On January 27, 2017, he scored a then career-high 20 points in a 128–98 victory over the Orlando Magic.

Brown helped the Celtics claim the top seed in the Eastern Conference before helping them advance to the Eastern Conference Finals, where the Celtics lost to the Cavaliers in five games. Brown had a productive rookie season, with his role off the bench continuing to develop as the year went on. Brown averaged 17.2 minutes on the floor, 6.6 points, 2.8 rebounds, and 0.8 assists in 78 games and 20 starts. He was named to the NBA All-Rookie Second Team at the end of the season.

==== 2017–18 season: Sophomore season ====
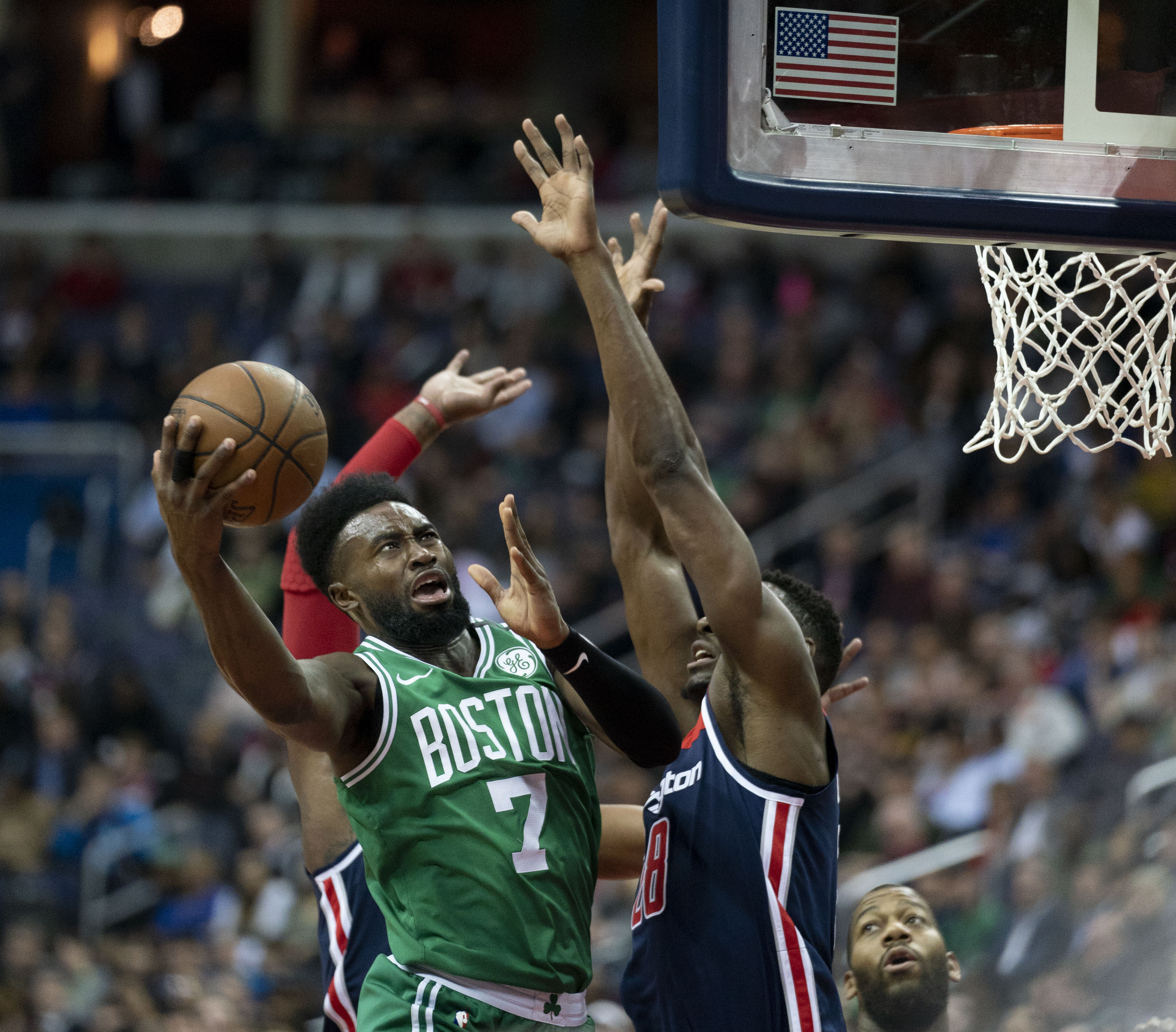
Brown in 2018

During the offseason, the Celtics drafted Jayson Tatum third overall in the 2017 NBA draft. The duo made their debut in the Celtics' season-opening 102–99 loss to the Cleveland Cavaliers on October 17, 2017, where Brown scored a then-career-high 25 points. On November 18, he had a then-career-high 27 points and helped the Celtics win their 15th straight game with a 110–99 victory over the Atlanta Hawks. On December 13, Brown had a 26-point outing in a 124–118 victory over the Denver Nuggets. He missed two weeks in March 2018 with a concussion. On April 6, Brown set a then-career-high with 32 points in a 111–104 victory over the Chicago Bulls.

On April 17, in Game 2 of the Celtics' first-round playoff series against the Milwaukee Bucks, he had a then playoff career-high 30 points in helping Boston take a 2–0 series lead with a 120–106 victory. At age 21, Brown became the youngest player in Celtics history to score 30 or more points in a playoff game. Five days later in Game 4, he set a new playoff career-high and scored a career-high 34 points in a narrow 104–102 loss. The Celtics went on to win the series in seven games, with Brown sitting out of Game 1 of the Eastern Conference Semifinals against the Philadelphia 76ers with a strained hamstring. He returned to action on May 3 in Game 2, scoring 13 points off the bench in a 108–103 victory, helping the Celtics take a 2–0 series lead. Six days later in Game 5, Brown had 24 points during a narrow 114–112 series-clinching victory. On May 25, in Game 6 of the Eastern Conference Finals, he scored 27 points in a 109–99 loss to the Cavaliers. The Celtics went on to lose the series in seven games.

==== 2018–19 season: Struggles ====
Brown struggled to start the season, with the Boston Globe criticizing him for taking too many two-point jump shots and an overall "lack of focus and discipline." After the Celtics unexpectedly started the season with a 10–10 record, ESPN's Jackie MacMullan wrote that "nobody disappointed [the Celtics] more than Brown." On December 6, 2018, Brown returned after missing three games with a bruised lower back and scored 21 points in a 128–100 victory over the New York Knicks. Two days later, he scored a game-high 23 points during a 133–77 blowout victory over the Chicago Bulls. On December 31, Brown had a season-high 30 points in a 120–111 loss to the San Antonio Spurs.

==== 2019–20 season: Breakthrough ====
In October 2019, Brown signed a four-year, $115 million contract extension with the Celtics.

On December 28, 2019, Brown tied his career-high of 34 points in a 129–117 victory over the Cleveland Cavaliers. In January, Brown narrowly missed being selected to the 2020 NBA All-Star Game. In the playoffs, the Celtics advanced to the Eastern Conference Finals for the third time in Brown's four years in the NBA following series victories over the Philadelphia 76ers and Toronto Raptors in four and seven games, respectively. They were eliminated in the Conference Finals by the Miami Heat in six games.

==== 2020–21 season: First All-Star appearance ====
On December 30, 2020, Brown recorded a then-career-high 42 points along with five rebounds and four assists in a 126–107 victory over the Memphis Grizzlies. On February 24, 2021, he was selected to the 2021 All-Star team as a reserve, his first time being named an NBA All-Star. On April 15, Brown scored 40 points in a 121–113 victory over the Los Angeles Lakers. His then-career-best season ended with only four regular season games left to be played, as Brown had to undergo wrist surgery for a torn scapholunate ligament in his left wrist.

==== 2021–22 season: First NBA Finals appearance ====
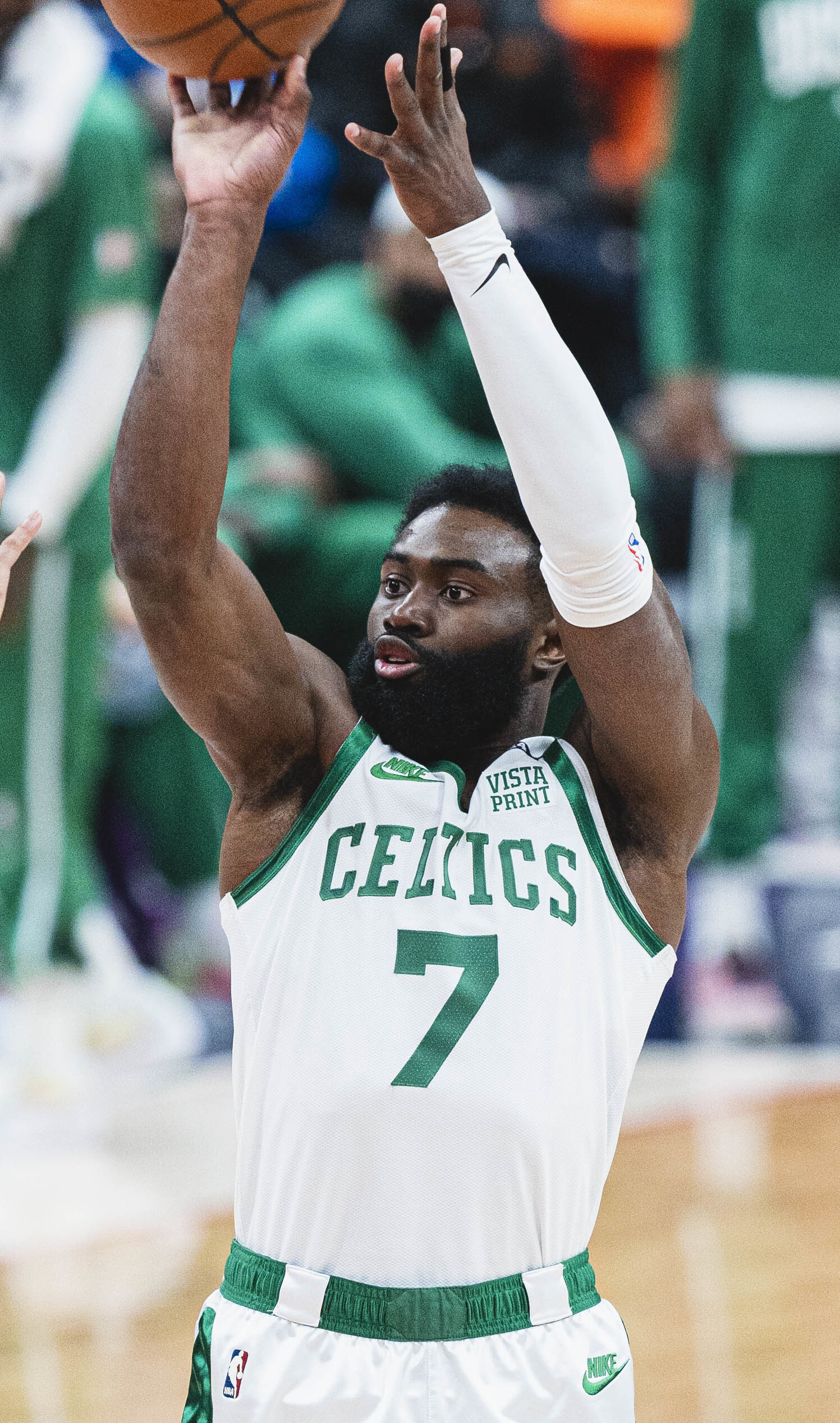
Brown in 2022

On October 20, 2021, Brown recorded a then-career-high 46 points in the season-opening 138–134 double-overtime loss to the New York Knicks while also setting a Celtics franchise record for points on an opening night. On January 2, 2022, he surpassed that career-high, scoring 50 points while also grabbing 11 rebounds during a 116–111 overtime victory over the Orlando Magic. Six days later against the New York Knicks, Brown recorded his first career triple-double with 22 points, 11 rebounds, and a career-high 11 assists in a 99–75 blowout victory. On March 18, during a 126–97 victory over the Sacramento Kings, Brown and Jayson Tatum each scored at least 30 points in the same game for the fourth time in the season and the eighth time overall, tying the record for the most such games with fellow Celtics' Larry Bird and Kevin McHale, who also recorded four such games in the 1986–87 season. Two days later, in a 124–104 victory over the Denver Nuggets, Brown and Tatum broke the record by both scoring 30 points with over 60% shooting from the field.

On May 3, in Game 2 of the Eastern Conference Semifinals, Brown scored 25 of his 30 points in the first half while also recording six rebounds, six assists, and two steals in a 109–86 victory over the reigning champion Milwaukee Bucks. Four days later in Game 3, he posted 27 points, 12 rebounds, and four assists in a narrow 103–101 loss. On May 21, in Game 3 of the Eastern Conference Finals, Brown scored a playoff career-high 40 points on 14-of-20 shooting from the field in a 109–103 loss to the Miami Heat. Eight days later in Game 7, he had 24 points, six rebounds, and six assists during a 100–96 victory, advancing to the NBA Finals for the first time in his career and the Celtics' first NBA Finals appearance since 2010. During Game 1 of the 2022 NBA Finals on June 2, Brown posted 24 points, seven rebounds, and five assists in a 120–108 comeback victory over the Golden State Warriors. Six days later in Game 3, he recorded 27 points, nine rebounds, and five assists in a 116–100 victory to take a 2–1 series lead. The Celtics went on to lose the series in six games despite Brown's 34-point outing in the 103–90 closeout loss on June 16 in Game 6.

==== 2022–23 season: First All-NBA team selection ====
On December 2, 2022, Brown recorded 37 points, 14 rebounds, and five assists in a 120–116 overtime loss to the Miami Heat. He sent the game to overtime by making a long three-pointer with 1.7 seconds left in regulation. On December 13, Brown posted 25 points, a season-high 15 rebounds, five assists, and three steals in a 122–118 overtime victory over the Los Angeles Lakers. On December 25, he had 29 points, five rebounds, and four assists in a 139–118 victory over the Milwaukee Bucks. Brown and Jayson Tatum (41 points) combined for 70 points in a game for the eighth time in their careers. On January 11, 2023, Brown scored a then-season-high 41 points on 15-of-21 shooting from the field and grabbed 12 rebounds in a 125–114 victory over the New Orleans Pelicans. It was the fifth 40-point game in Brown's career and the 10th time that Brown and Tatum (31 points) combined to score 70+ points. The Celtics were undefeated in those games. On February 2, Brown was named to his second NBA All-Star Game. On March 6, Brown posted a near triple-double with 32 points, 13 rebounds, and nine assists in a 118–114 overtime loss to the Cleveland Cavaliers. On March 13, he scored a season-high 43 points in a narrow 111–109 loss to the Houston Rockets. On March 26, Brown recorded 41 points and 13 rebounds in a 137–93 blowout victory over the San Antonio Spurs.

On April 15, in Game 1 of the Eastern Conference first round against the Atlanta Hawks, Brown had 29 points and 12 rebounds in a 112–99 victory. Eight days later in Game 4, he and Jayson Tatum both scored 31 points, leading the team to a 129–121 victory. During the second quarter, Brown took off his protective mask he had worn since February due to a stray elbow from Tatum. On May 5, in Game 3 of the Eastern Conference semifinals against the Philadelphia 76ers, Brown and Tatum combined for 50 points during a 114–102 victory. The Celtics reached the Eastern Conference Finals, where they lost to the Miami Heat in seven games.

==== 2023–24 season: First NBA championship and Finals MVP ====
On July 25, 2023, Brown signed a five-year contract extension worth up to $304 million, surpassing Nikola Jokić's $276 million extension as the richest deal in NBA history. Brown became eligible for the five-year "supermax" extension after making second-team All-NBA during the 2022–23 season.

On January 22, 2024, Brown recorded his third career triple-double with 13 points, 11 rebounds, 10 assists, and three steals in a 116–107 victory over the Houston Rockets. On February 1, Brown was named to his third All-Star Game as an Eastern Conference reserve. On March 7, Brown scored a season-high 41 points and grabbed 14 rebounds in a 115–109 loss to the Denver Nuggets. Later that month, he claimed that the 2023–24 season had been the best season of his career. On April 7, Brown had 26 points en route to achieving 10,000 career points in a 124–107 victory over the Portland Trail Blazers.

On May 21, in Game 1 of the Eastern Conference Finals against the Indiana Pacers, Brown recorded 26 points, seven rebounds, and five assists, as well as a clutch three-pointer to send the game to overtime during a 133–128 overtime victory. Two days later in Game 2, Brown matched his playoff career-high of 40 points during a 126–110 victory. The Celtics swept the Pacers in four games, and Brown was named the Eastern Conference finals MVP after averaging 29.8 points, 5.0 rebounds, 3.0 assists, and 2.0 steals per game while shooting 51.7 percent from the field and 37.0 percent from three-point range.

During Game 1 of the 2024 NBA Finals on June 6, Brown had 22 points, six rebounds, three blocks, three steals, and two assists in a 107–89 victory over the Dallas Mavericks. Six days later in Game 3, he recorded 30 points, eight rebounds, and a playoff career-high eight assists in a 106–99 victory. Brown became the second Celtic with 30+ points, 8+ rebounds, and 8+ assists in an NBA Finals game, joining John Havlicek (1968). Brown and Jayson Tatum became the first Celtics duo to each post at least 30/5/5 in an NBA Finals game. They also set the record for the most 25+ point games by a Celtics duo in postseason history, surpassing Larry Bird and Kevin McHale (17). The Celtics went on to win the series in five games, and Brown was named Finals MVP after averaging 20.8 points, 5.4 rebounds, and 5.0 assists per game while being the primary defender on Luka Dončić.

==== 2024–25 season: Coming up short ====
On December 27, 2024, Brown notched a season-high 44 points, shooting 16/24 from the field with 6 three-pointers and a perfect 6/6 from the free-throw line in a 142–105 win over the Indiana Pacers. On January 30, 2025, Brown was named as a reserve for the 2025 NBA All-Star Game, his fourth selection. Brown finished the regular season averaging a career-best 4.5 assists per game, reflecting improved playmaking, while maintaining a 2.6 turnover average.

In the playoffs, despite playing through a partially torn meniscus, Brown averaged 22.1 points, 7.1 rebounds, and a career-high 3.9 assists per game. Boston was eliminated in the Eastern Conference semifinals by the New York Knicks, falling 4–2 in the series. In spite of losing Jayson Tatum to injury in Game 4, Brown delivered strong performances, including a near triple-double in Game 5 with 26 points, eight rebounds, and a playoff career-high 12 assists, but the Celtics were unable to extend the series and were defeated in Game 6. He underwent arthroscopic right knee surgery in mid-June to address the postseason meniscus tear, though Brown was expected to be fully recovered by training camp.

==== 2025–26 season: Career-high in scoring ====
With Jayson Tatum sidelined due to an Achilles injury, Brown assumed the role of the Celtics’ primary offensive option. On November 29, 2025, Brown tied his then season high by scoring 41 points and also contributed six rebounds, seven assists, and a career-high five steals in the Celtics’ 119–115 loss to the Minnesota Timberwolves. He became the first player in the play-by-play era to record at least 27 points, five rebounds, five assists, and three steals in a first half. On November 30, Brown recorded his fourth career triple-double with 19 points and 12 rebounds, and tied his then career-high with 11 assists in a 117–115 win over the Cleveland Cavaliers. On December 2, Brown scored a season-high 42 points, shooting 16 of 24 to lead the Celtics to a 123–117 victory over the New York Knicks. On December 28, Brown put up 37 points, seven rebounds, and four assists on 14-of-23 shooting from the field in a 114–108 loss to the Portland Trail Blazers, extending his streak of scoring at least 30 points to nine consecutive games, tying the franchise record set by Larry Bird during the 1984–85 season.

On January 4, 2026, Brown matched his career-high of 50 points, shooting 18-of-26 to lead the Celtics to a 146–115 victory over the Los Angeles Clippers. He joined Jayson Tatum (5x) and Larry Bird (4x) as the only players in Celtics history to record multiple 50-point games. On January 19, Brown earned his fifth NBA All-Star selection and was named a starter for the first time. On January 23, Brown recorded his fifth career triple-double, posting 27 points, 10 rebounds, and a then career-high of 12 assists in a 130–126 overtime win over the Brooklyn Nets. On February 1, the Celtics won the NBA Pioneers Classic 107–97 over the Milwaukee Bucks, with Brown posting 30 points and 13 rebounds. On February 2, Brown won his first NBA Player of the Month award, being named the Eastern Conference Player of the Month for January. He finished the month averaging 29.2 points, 7.9 rebounds, and 4.6 assists per game. On February 19, Brown registered his sixth career triple-double with 23 points, tied his career-high with 15 rebounds, and set a new career-high with 13 assists in a 121–110 win over the Golden State Warriors.

Brown finished the regular season with career highs of 28.7 points, 6.9 rebounds, and 5.1 assists per game, becoming just the third player in Celtics history to average at least 28 points, 5 rebounds, and 5 assists in a season, after John Havlicek and Larry Bird. He led the Celtics to the second-best record in the Eastern Conference, finishing 56–26, in spite of Tatum playing in only 16 games. Brown ranked sixth in NBA Most Valuable Player Award voting and was named to the All-NBA Second Team for the second time in his career. Despite Brown averaging a playoff career-high 25.7 points per game, the Celtics were eliminated in the Eastern Conference First Round by the Philadelphia 76ers after a hard-fought seven-game series. In Game 7, Brown recorded 33 points, nine rebounds, four assists, and three blocks, but the Celtics fell 109–100 to the 76ers; Tatum missed the game due to left knee stiffness.

=== Philadelphia 76ers (2026–present) ===
On July 6, 2026, Brown was traded to the Philadelphia 76ers in exchange for Paul George, two first-round picks (in the 2028 and 2031 NBA drafts) and two second-round picks (2028 and 2030 NBA drafts).

On October 20, Brown made his 76ers debut, putting up 19 points, eight rebounds, and six assists in a 106–100 win over the New York Knicks.

== Awards and honors ==
NBA

- NBA champion: 2024
- NBA Finals MVP: 2024
- NBA Eastern Conference Finals MVP: 2024
- 5× NBA All-Star: 2021, 2023–2026
- 2× All-NBA Second Team: 2023, 2026
- NBA All-Rookie Second Team: 2017

USA Basketball

- FIBA Americas U18 Championship gold medalist: 2014

== Career statistics ==
Legend
GP	Games played	GS	Games started	MPG	Minutes per game
FG%	Field goal percentage	3P%	3-point field goal percentage	FT%	Free throw percentage
RPG	Rebounds per game	APG	Assists per game	SPG	Steals per game
BPG	Blocks per game	PPG	Points per game	**Bold**	Career high
†	Won an NBA championship

=== NBA ===
==== Regular season ====
Year	Team	GP	GS	MPG	FG%	3P%	FT%	RPG	APG	SPG	BPG	PPG
2016–17	Boston	**78**	20	17.2	.454	.341	.685	2.8	.8	.4	.2	6.6
2017–18	Boston	70	70	30.7	.465	.395	.644	4.9	1.6	1.0	.4	14.5
2018–19	Boston	74	25	25.9	.465	.344	.658	4.2	1.4	.9	.4	13.0
2019–20	Boston	57	57	33.9	.481	.382	.724	6.4	2.1	1.1	.4	20.3
2020–21	Boston	58	58	34.5	.484	**.397**	.764	6.0	3.4	**1.2**	**.6**	24.7
2021–22	Boston	66	66	33.6	.473	.358	.758	6.1	3.5	1.1	.3	23.6
2022–23	Boston	67	67	**35.9**	.491	.335	.765	**6.9**	3.5	1.1	.4	26.6
2023–24†	Boston	70	70	33.5	**.499**	.354	.703	5.5	3.6	**1.2**	.5	23.0
2024–25	Boston	63	63	34.3	.463	.324	.764	5.8	4.5	**1.2**	.3	22.2
2025–26	Boston	71	**71**	34.4	.477	.347	**.795**	**6.9**	**5.1**	1.0	.4	**28.7**
Career		674	567	31.0	.478	.358	.739	5.5	2.9	1.0	.4	20.0
All-Star		5	1	23.3	.559	.341	.333	6.8	2.4	1.4	.6	24.0

==== Playoffs ====
Year	Team	GP	GS	MPG	FG%	3P%	FT%	RPG	APG	SPG	BPG	PPG
2017	Boston	17	0	12.6	.479	.217	.667	2.1	.8	.4	.1	5.0
2018	Boston	18	15	32.4	.466	.393	.640	4.8	1.4	.8	.6	18.0
2019	Boston	9	9	30.4	.506	.350	.767	5.8	1.1	.7	.2	13.9
2020	Boston	17	17	**39.5**	.476	.358	**.841**	**7.5**	2.3	**1.5**	.5	21.8
2022	Boston	**24**	**24**	38.3	.470	.373	.763	6.9	3.5	1.1	.4	23.1
2023	Boston	20	20	37.6	.496	.354	.689	5.6	3.4	1.1	.4	22.7
2024†	Boston	19	19	37.2	**.516**	.327	.660	5.9	3.3	1.2	.6	23.9
2025	Boston	11	11	36.5	.441	.333	.758	7.1	**3.9**	1.0	.3	22.1
2026	Boston	7	7	35.6	.455	**.405**	.717	5.7	3.3	.9	**1.1**	**25.7**
Career		142	122	33.6	.480	.357	.726	5.7	2.6	1.0	.5	19.6

=== College ===
Year	Team	GP	GS	MPG	FG%	3P%	FT%	RPG	APG	SPG	BPG	PPG
2015–16	California	34	34	27.6	.431	.294	.654	5.4	2.0	.8	.6	14.6

== Personal life ==
Brown is primarily a vegetarian and his interests include Spanish language, history, meditation, philosophy, playing instruments, and anime. Many have described Brown as an unusual athlete with many ambitions beyond basketball. Brown, who is African-American, assembled a primarily African-American advisory team prior to the NBA draft, but he did not hire an agent. According to Marc J. Spears of Andscape, one unnamed executive referred to Brown as "too smart for the league".

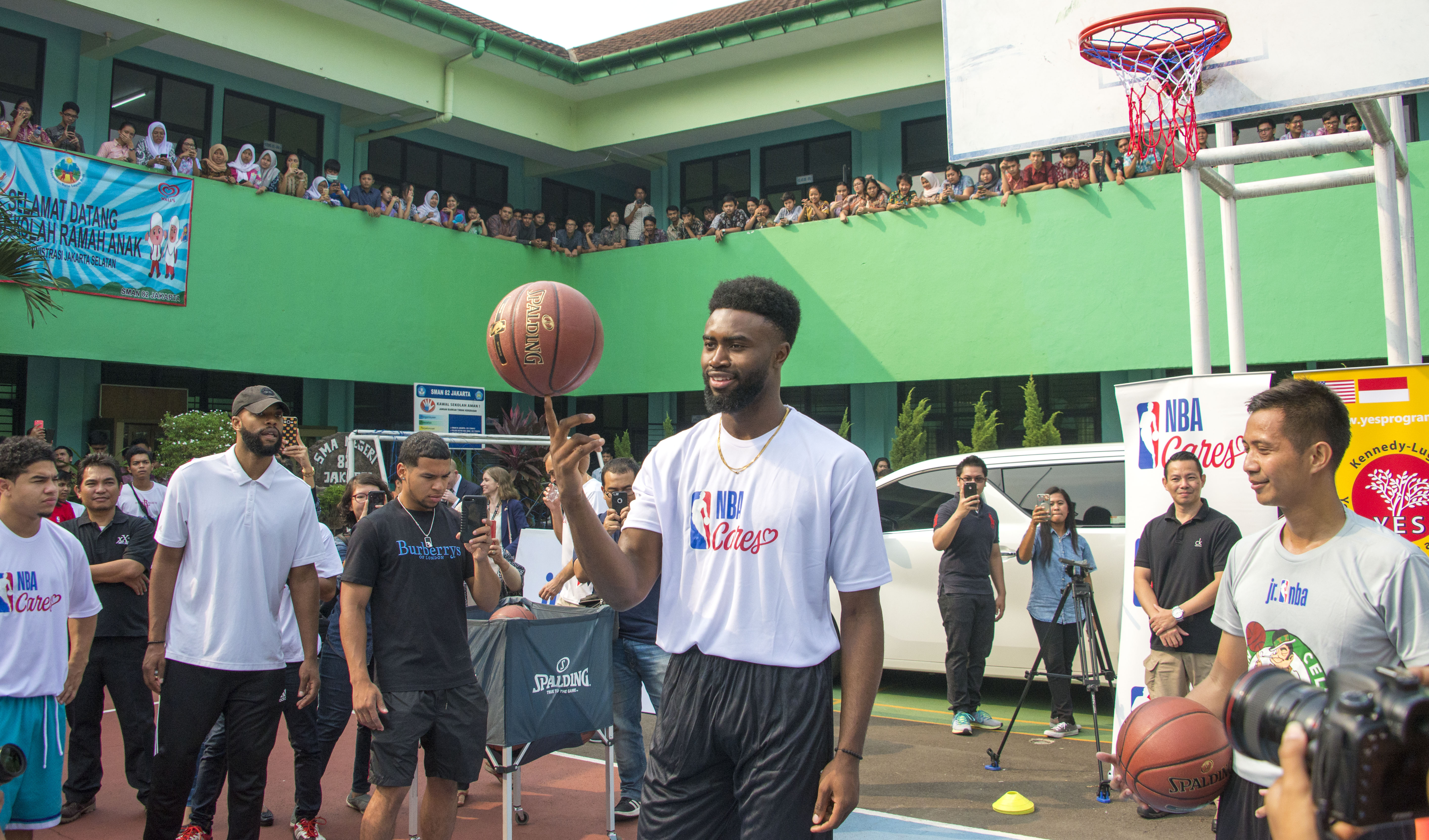
Brown teaching students how to play basketball in Jakarta, Indonesia in 2018

At age 22, Brown became the National Basketball Players Association's youngest elected vice president. In recent years, he has spoken on the importance of education and technology at Harvard University, MIT, and his alma mater, Berkeley. In 2019, Brown was named an MIT Media Lab fellow, and he has since collaborated with the university to create the Bridge Program, which mentors Greater Boston youth and high school students of color who are interested in pursuing careers in STEM programs. Through his work with MIT and his 7uice Foundation, Brown has taken a strong interest in tackling education and income inequality, among other social advocacy initiatives.

He was offered an internship with NASA, was the youngest person to ever hold a lecture at Harvard, and was in the middle of a robotics class when he learned that his agent had secured him the largest contract in NBA history.

Brown has a YouTube channel where he has posted several documentary-style video series depicting his life during the season and off-season workouts. The first episode, FCHWPO: Pawn to E4, was posted on January 31, 2017. The video title refers to Brown's love of chess. FCHWPO, which is also his Twitter and Instagram handle, stands for "Faith, Consistency, Hard Work Pays Off."

Brown is a practicing Muslim, having converted in 2021. In June 2024, Brown performed a pilgrimage to Mecca in the form of an Umrah.

Brown is also an avid fan of anime, according to Brown, his favorites are Death Note, Demon Slayer: Kimetsu no Yaiba, Neo Yokio, and Seven Deadly Sins. Brown also watched the boxing anime, Baki with NBA player Tacko Fall, which helped the two develop a relationship over their love for anime.

In August 2026 during a farewell event in Boston, Brown was given the keys to the state of Massachusetts on behalf of the Commonwealth by Rep. Christopher Worrell for his contributions to the city of Boston during his tenure both as a player for the Celtics and his efforts to improve the community in Boston. He was also presented with a ceremonial street sign called "Jaylen Brown Way" by Boston Mayor Michelle Wu.

Brown starred in an October 2026 episode of Abbott Elementary.

=== Family and relationships ===
Brown's father, Quenton Marselles Brown, is a former professional boxer who is the 2016 WBU World Champion, the 2015 WBU C.A.M. Heavyweight Champion, and a member of the Hawaii State Boxing Commission Board. In August 2025, the elder Brown was charged with attempted murder after allegedly stabbing a man multiple times in Las Vegas following a traffic incident.

Brown's grandfather, Willie Brown, is also a former boxer. Brown is the cousin of former professional football cornerback A. J. Bouye. Brown is also the cousin of New England Patriots wide receiver A. J. Brown.

In 2024, Brown was accompanied by WNBA player Kysre Gondrezick during the Celtics' championship parade and later to the ESPY Awards. On the latter occasion, Brown described Gondrezick as "my date."

In September 2026, as a person of African descent, Brown visited Ile-Ife in Osun State, Nigeria as part of his cultural trip with his team and met with the monarchical head of the Yoruba race “the Ooni of Ife”. At the ceremony, he was given the Yoruba “Babatunde”.

== See also ==
- List of NBA career turnovers leaders
- List of NBA career playoff 3-point scoring leaders
