= Kysre Gondrezick =

American basketball player and model (born 1997)

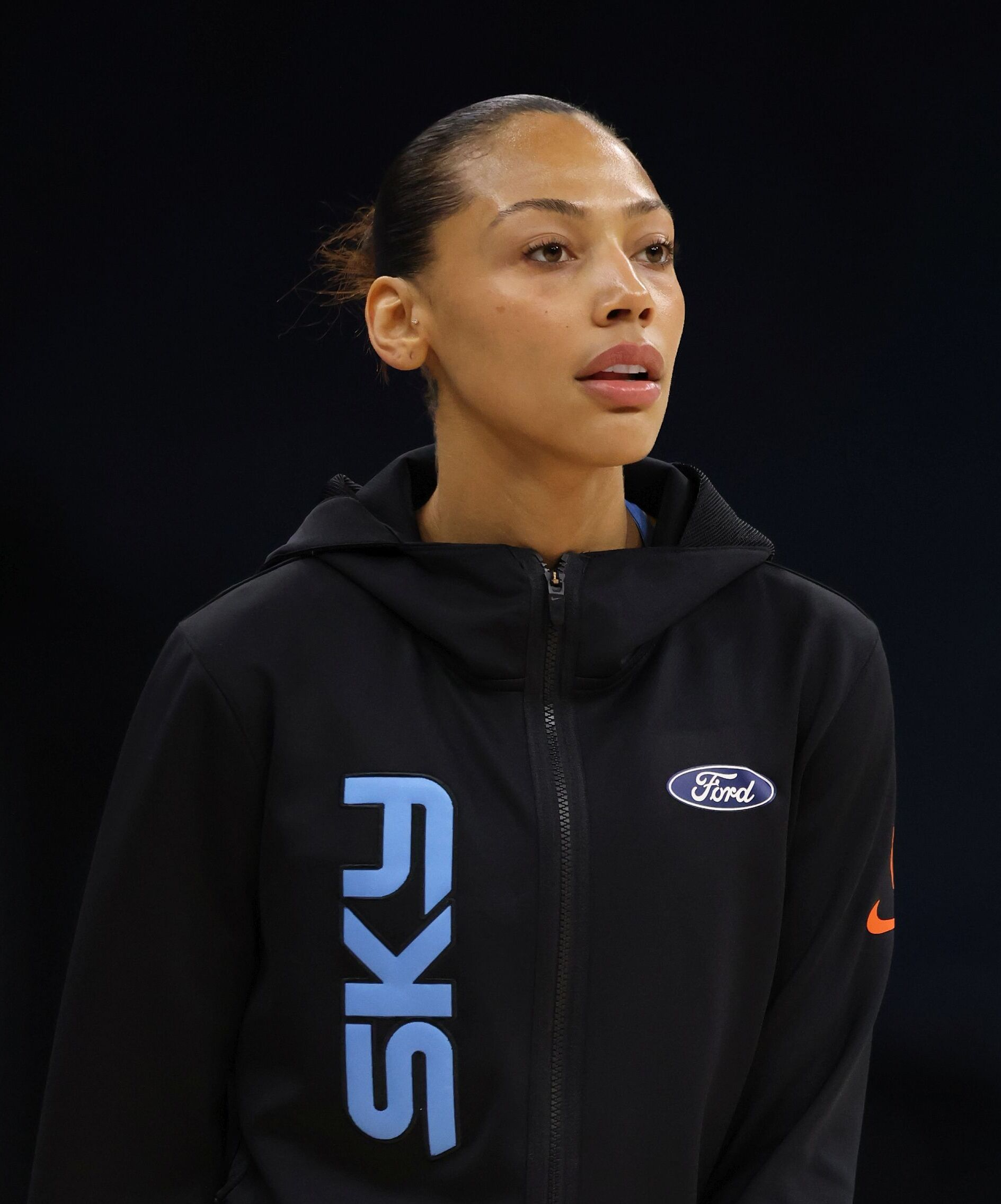
- Gondrezick with the Chicago Sky in 2024

Personal information
- Born: July 27, 1997 (age 29) Benton Harbor, Michigan, U.S.
- Listed height: 5 ft 9 in (1.75 m)
- Listed weight: 150 lb (68 kg)

Career information
- High school: Benton Harbor (Benton Harbor, Michigan)
- College: Michigan (2016–2017); West Virginia (2017–2020)
- WNBA draft: 2021: 1st round, 4th overall pick
- Drafted by: Indiana Fever
- Playing career: 2021–present
- Position: Shooting guard

Career history
- 2021: Indiana Fever
- 2024: Chicago Sky

Career highlights
- First-team All-Big-12 (2021); Big Ten All-Freshman Team (2017); Michigan Miss Basketball (2016)
- Stats at Basketball Reference

Kysre Rae Gondrezick (KY-zuhr GONE-dre-zick; born July 27, 1997) is an American professional basketball player and model who last played for the Chicago Sky of the Women's National Basketball Association (WNBA). She has previously played for the WNBA's Indiana Fever.

== Early life and college ==
Gondrezick played basketball at Benton Harbor High School in Benton Harbor, Michigan, where her mother served as an assistant coach. She was named 2016 Michigan Miss Basketball and Michigan Gatorade POY. Gondrezick averaged 40.5 points per game as senior and graduated as No. 2 scorer in Michigan girls history (2,827). She holds the Michigan High School Athletic Association record for points in a game when she scored 72 in a playoff game. She played college basketball at the University of Michigan and West Virginia University.

== Professional career ==
=== Indiana Fever ===
Gondrezick was the 4th pick in the 2021 WNBA draft by the Indiana Fever. In January 2022, Gondrezick was waived by the Fever.

=== Chicago Sky ===
After joining the Chicago Sky for the team's 2022 training camp, Gondrezick was waived on May 4 and did not make the final roster for opening night.

On February 9, 2024, Gondrezick returned to the Chicago Sky for the team's 2024 training camp. On May 14, it was announced that Gondrezick had made Chicago's Opening Day roster. Gondrezick was released for a second time from Chicago on June 28.

On January 14, 2026, Gondrezick announced that she had suffered a torn Achilles tendon.

=== Media and modeling career ===
In 2025, Gondrezick was featured by Playboy as Miss June 2025, becoming the first active professional female basketball player to hold a Playmate title.

== Personal life ==
Gondrezick is the daughter of the late former NBA player Grant Gondrezick and Lisa Harvey. Her father Grant played college basketball at Pepperdine, her mother Lisa won a national title at Louisiana Tech, and her sister Kalabrya played for Michigan State Spartans women's basketball. Her late uncle, Glen Gondrezick, was a swingman in the NBA.

On September 11, 2023, Gondrezick was the victim of domestic violence by her boyfriend at the time, NBA player Kevin Porter Jr. The result of the criminal case led to Porter Jr.'s team at the time, the Houston Rockets, trading him to the Oklahoma City Thunder on October 17; the Thunder immediately waived him afterward. One of Porter Jr.'s charges in the case against Gondrezick was later dropped. The case between Gondrezick and Porter Jr. concluded on January 23, 2024 with Porter Jr. taking a plea deal with prosecutors where he accepted a guilty verdict to a misdemeanor charge of reckless assault and a second-degree harassment violation in exchange for completing a certain number of conditions in order to help him clear his criminal record after a year passes by.

In 2024, she accompanied Boston Celtics player Jaylen Brown during the Celtics' NBA Championship parade and to the ESPY Awards. Brown described Gondrezick on the latter occasion as "my date."

== Endorsements ==
In April 2021, it was announced that Gondrezick and Adidas entered into a multiyear endorsement agreement.

== Career statistics ==
Legend
GP	Games played	GS	Games started	MPG	Minutes per game	RPG	Rebounds per game
APG	Assists per game	SPG	Steals per game	BPG	Blocks per game	PPG	Points per game
TO	Turnovers per game	FG%	Field-goal percentage	3P%	3-point field-goal percentage	FT%	Free-throw percentage
**Bold**	Career best	°	League leader

=== WNBA ===
==== Regular season ====
Stats current through end of 2024 regular season

WNBA regular season statistics
Year	Team	GP	GS	MPG	FG%	3P%	FT%	RPG	APG	SPG	BPG	TO	PPG
2021	Indiana	19	0	9.1	.283	.286	.500	1.0	0.9	0.4	0.0	0.9	1.9
2022	Did not play (waived)												
2023	Did not play												
2024	Chicago	5	0	3.2	.286	.167	—	0.4	0.4	0.8	0.0	0.6	1.0
**Career**	2 years, 2 teams	24	0	7.9	.283	.265	.500	0.9	0.8	0.5	0.0	0.8	1.7

=== College ===
NCAA statistics
Year	Team	GP	GS	MPG	FG%	3P%	FT%	RPG	APG	SPG	BPG	TO	PPG
2016–17	Michigan	**33**	16	27.8	**.426**	**.429**	.670	**3.6**	2.8	1.2	0.0	2.2	14.9
2017–18	West Virginia	Did not play to NCAA transfer rules											
2018–19	West Virginia	5	4	31.2	.373	.231	.640	3.4	4.0	**2.4**	**0.2**	**3.2**	13.2
2019–20	West Virginia	26	24	33.0	.373	.349	.774	3.6	3.2	1.3	0.0	2.1	15.3
2020–21	West Virginia	28	**28**	**37.3**	.421	.364	**.775**	2.9	**4.5**	1.7	0.0	2.7	**19.5**
**Career**		92	72	32.3	.407	.374	.734	3.4	3.5	1.4	0.0	2.4	16.3
