= NBA conference finals MVP awards =

National Basketball Association award

- Awarded for: Most valuable player of the NBA conference finals
- Presented by: National Basketball Association

History
- First award: 2022: Jayson Tatum (East); Stephen Curry (West)
- Most recent: 2026: Jalen Brunson (East); Victor Wembanyama (West)

The National Basketball Association (NBA) annually honors the most valuable players (MVPs) of both of its conference finals. Presented since the 2022 playoffs, the awards are decided by a panel of media members, who cast votes after the conclusion of the conference finals. The person with the highest number of votes in each conference wins the award.

The Larry Bird Trophy is awarded to the MVP from the Eastern Conference and the Earvin "Magic" Johnson Trophy for the Western Conference. Their namesakes, Hall of Fame players Larry Bird and Magic Johnson, both made their NBA debuts in 1979, and their bi-coastal rivalry in the 1980s helped revive and popularize the league. The inaugural recipients were Jayson Tatum (Eastern Conference) and Stephen Curry (Western Conference).

== Winners ==
^	Denotes player who is still active in the NBA
*	Player won Finals MVP the same year

=== Eastern Conference ===
Year	Player	Position	Nationality	Team
2022	Jayson Tatum^	Forward	United States	Boston Celtics
2023	Jimmy Butler^	Forward	United States	Miami Heat
2024*	Jaylen Brown^	Forward	United States	Boston Celtics
2025	Pascal Siakam^	Forward	Cameroon	Indiana Pacers
2026*	Jalen Brunson^	Guard	United States	New York Knicks

=== Western Conference ===
Year	Player	Position	Nationality	Team
2022*	Stephen Curry^	Guard	United States	Golden State Warriors
2023*	Nikola Jokić^	Center	Serbia	Denver Nuggets
2024	Luka Dončić^	Guard	Slovenia	Dallas Mavericks
2025*	Shai Gilgeous-Alexander^	Guard	Canada	Oklahoma City Thunder
2026	Victor Wembanyama^	Center	France	San Antonio Spurs

== Teams ==
Awards	Teams	Years
2	Boston Celtics	2022, 2024
1	Golden State Warriors	2022
1	Miami Heat	2023
1	Denver Nuggets	2023
1	Dallas Mavericks	2024
1	Oklahoma City Thunder	2025
1	Indiana Pacers	2025
1	New York Knicks	2026
1	San Antonio Spurs	2026

== See also ==
- NBA Most Valuable Player
- NBA Finals Most Valuable Player
- NBA All-Star Game Kobe Bryant Most Valuable Player
