= Aaron Nesmith =

American basketball player (born 1999)

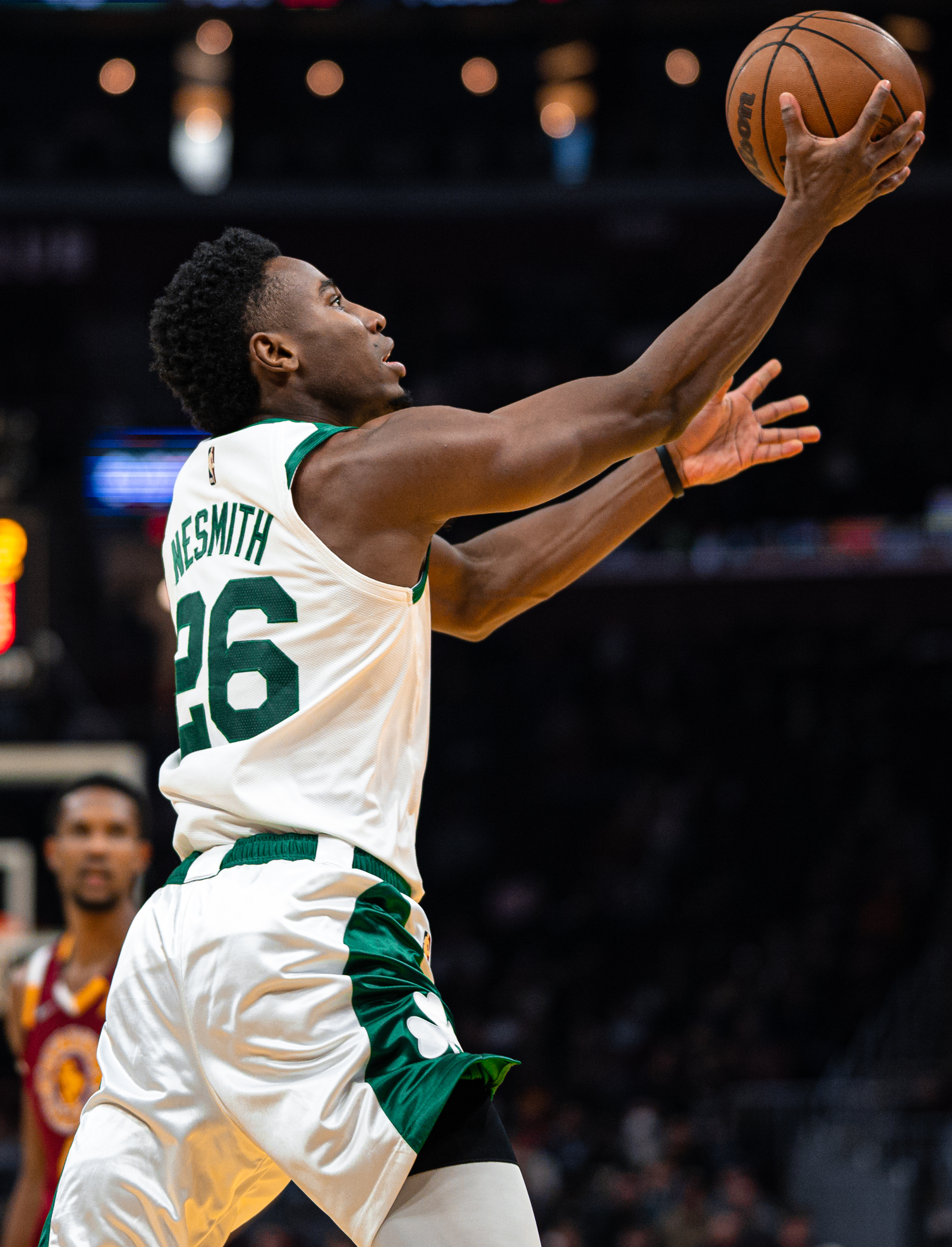
- Nesmith with the Boston Celtics in 2021

No. 23 – Indiana Pacers
- Position: Small forward / shooting guard
- League: NBA

Personal information
- Born: October 16, 1999 (age 27) Charleston, South Carolina, U.S.
- Listed height: 6 ft 5 in (1.96 m)
- Listed weight: 215 lb (98 kg)

Career information
- High school: Porter-Gaud (Charleston, South Carolina)
- College: Vanderbilt (2018–2020)
- NBA draft: 2020: 1st round, 14th overall pick
- Drafted by: Boston Celtics
- Playing career: 2020–present

Career history
- 2020–2022: Boston Celtics
- 2022: →Maine Celtics
- 2022–present: Indiana Pacers
- Stats at NBA.com
- Stats at Basketball Reference

Aaron Joshua Nesmith (/ˈniːsmɪθ/ NEE-smith; born October 16, 1999) is an American professional basketball player for the Indiana Pacers of the National Basketball Association (NBA). He played college basketball for the Vanderbilt Commodores before being drafted 14th overall in the 2020 NBA draft by the Boston Celtics. He was part of the roster that reached the 2022 NBA Finals before he was traded to the Pacers in a package surrounding Malcolm Brogdon.

== Early life ==
Nesmith was born on October 16, 1999 in Charleston, South Carolina. He attended Porter-Gaud School in Charleston beginning in the fifth grade and was first called up to the varsity basketball team as an eighth-grader. As a sophomore, Nesmith won the South Carolina Independent School Association (SCISA) Class 3A state title as his team's leading scorer. Nesmith led Porter-Gaud to two more Class 3A state championships in his final two seasons. As a senior, he averaged 21 points, 4.5 rebounds, and 1.8 assists per game and was named South Carolina Gatorade Player of the Year for his success in basketball and academics. He left high school as a three-time SCISA Class 3A player of the year. Nesmith was a four star recruit in high school and was the 64th ranked player in the country, the 12th ranked shooting guard in the country, and 2nd ranked in all of South Carolina. Nesmith would end up committing to Vanderbilt on 9/19/2017.

Nesmith did not receive offers from any high major NCAA Division I programs until he was a senior, but he began drawing more attention after an Amateur Athletic Union (AAU) tournament in Charlotte, North Carolina. He was rated a four-star recruit by ESPN and 247Sports and committed to Vanderbilt over offers from Florida, South Carolina, Harvard, Virginia Tech, and Columbia.

== College career ==
In his freshman season for Vanderbilt, Nesmith assumed an important role after Darius Garland suffered a season-ending injury and Simisola Shittu underachieved. He started in a majority of his games and averaged 11 points and 5.5 rebounds per game, leading the Commodores in scoring in conference play. On February 18, 2019, Nesmith was named Southeastern Conference (SEC) Freshman of the Week following two career games. He scored a season-high 26 points against Florida and posted a double-double of 24 points and a season-high 14 rebounds against Auburn.

Nesmith made his sophomore season debut on November 6, 2019, scoring 25 points, including seven three-pointers, in a win over Southeast Missouri State. In the following week, he scored a career-high 34 points, hitting seven three-pointers, in an overtime loss to Richmond. Nesmith made four straight threes in a span of only one minute and 39 seconds. On December 6, Nesmith was named to the Oscar Robertson Trophy watch list. On December 21, he matched his career-high of 34 points and connected on seven three-pointers in a victory over UNC Wilmington. Nesmith scored 29 points and made eight three-pointers, the best mark of his career, on January 4, 2020, as his team lost to SMU in overtime. On January 11, 2020, it was initially announced that Nesmith would miss the remainder of the season with a right foot injury that he suffered in a loss to Auburn. In 14 games, he averaged 23 points and 4.9 rebounds per game, shooting 52.2 percent from three-point range. Nesmith was the fifth-leading scorer in the NCAA Division I and averaged the most points by a Vanderbilt player since Tom Hagan in the 1968–1969 season. He had been on pace to have one of the best three-point shooting seasons in college basketball history. However, after having surgery on January 28, Nesmith indicated that he might return before the end of the season. Nesmith did not return, and after the end of the season declared for the 2020 NBA draft.

== Professional career ==
=== Boston Celtics (2020–2022) ===
==== 2020–21 season: Rookie year ====
Nesmith was selected with the 14th pick in the first round of the 2020 NBA draft by the Boston Celtics. On November 24, 2020, the Boston Celtics signed Nesmith to a four-year, $16.5 million rookie contract including team options in the third and fourth year. With fellow rookie teammate Payton Pritchard absorbing many of injured Kemba Walker's minutes, it was difficult for Nesmith to crack the regular rotation for the first few months of the season. With injuries and Covid protocols plaguing the Celtics all season, extended absences from Marcus Smart, Kemba Walker, and other key players gave Nesmith enough opportunities to showcase not only his shooting capabilities, but also his gritty hustle and winning attitude. By April 23, 2021, coach Brad Stevens had seen enough from the rookie to warrant consistent rotation playing time to which he hovered around 20 minutes per game for the rest of the regular season. On April 28, 2021, Nesmith put on a show with multiple career–highs including 15 points, 9 rebounds, three steals, and three blocks in a winning effort against the Charlotte Hornets. He continued this momentum into the next two games where he eclipsed, and then matched, his then career–high with back to back 16 point performances.

==== 2021–22 season: First NBA Finals appearance ====
He played for the Celtics in the 2021 NBA summer league. On February 15, 2022, Nesmith recorded his Celtic career–high with 18 points in a win over the Philadelphia 76ers. In his second season, Nesmith and the Celtics reached the 2022 NBA Finals and lost in 6 games to the Golden State Warriors.

=== Indiana Pacers (2022–present) ===
==== 2022–23 season: Starting role ====
On July 9, 2022, Nesmith was traded, alongside Daniel Theis, Malik Fitts, Juwan Morgan, Nik Stauskas and a 2023 first-round pick, to the Indiana Pacers in exchange for Malcolm Brogdon. On November 19, Nesmith scored 19 points off the bench on 5–8 three-point shooting, while making two game-winning free throws with 9.6 seconds remaining, to defeat the Orlando Magic 114–113. On December 18, he became the Pacers starting small forward for the remainder of the season after posting new career-highs with 23 points and 10 rebounds in a loss to the New York Knicks. On December 21, in a win over his former team, Nesmith recorded 15 points and six rebounds as a starter, defeating the Celtics 117–112. On December 29, Nesmith recorded 22 points on an efficient 7–10 shooting from the field in a win over the Cleveland Cavaliers.

On February 2, 2023, Nesmith posted a then career–high in scoring with 24 points, 3 rebounds, 2 steals, and a block, on 9–12 shooting in a loss to the Los Angeles Lakers. On March 16, in a win over the Milwaukee Bucks, he recorded 22 points and 5 rebounds, on 8–11 shooting from the field, and a career–high 6–9 from three. The next game, on March 18 against the Philadelphia 76ers, Nesmith tallied a then career–high in scoring with 25 points and 6 rebounds, on 9–16 shooting from the field, and 4–9 from three.

==== 2023–24 season: Contract extension ====
On October 23, 2023, Nesmith agreed to a three–year $33 million contract extension with the Pacers. Five days later, Nesmith put up a new career–high 26 points along with 9 rebounds in a 125–113 win over the Cleveland Cavaliers. On November 6, Nesmith recorded an efficient 15 points, 2 rebounds, 2 assists, 2 steals, and 3 threes made in a 41–point blowout win over rookie Victor Wembanyama and the San Antonio Spurs, giving head coach Rick Carlisle his 900th career win. On December 30, Nesmith made a career-high 7 three-pointers in a victory over the New York Knicks, on a night where teammate Tyrese Haliburton tied the Pacers franchise record for assists in a game with 23.

==== 2024–25 season: Injury–riddled 50–40–90 season, second NBA Finals appearance ====
During the 2024–25 season, Nesmith converted 50.7% of his field goals, 43.1% of his three-point attempts and 91.3% of his free throw attempts, nearly qualifying to join the 50–40–90 club. On May 21, 2025, in Game 1 of the Eastern Conference Finals against the New York Knicks, Nesmith had a career-high 30 points on 9-of-13 shooting, including a career-high 8-of-9 from three-point range. Nesmith also made six consecutive threes in the final five minutes of regulation which helped the Pacers overcome a 14-point deficit in a 138–135 overtime win. Indiana went on to defeat New York in six games to win the Eastern Conference championship and advance to the 2025 NBA Finals against the Oklahoma City Thunder, Nesmith’s second appearance in the Finals, following the 2022 loss to the Golden State Warriors as a member of the Celtics.

==== 2025–26 season ====
On October 20, 2025, Nesmith and the Pacers agreed to a two-year, $40.4 million contract extension.

== Career statistics ==
Legend
GP	Games played	GS	Games started	MPG	Minutes per game
FG%	Field goal percentage	3P%	3-point field goal percentage	FT%	Free throw percentage
RPG	Rebounds per game	APG	Assists per game	SPG	Steals per game
BPG	Blocks per game	PPG	Points per game	**Bold**	Career high
*	Led the league

=== NBA ===
==== Regular season ====
Year	Team	GP	GS	MPG	FG%	3P%	FT%	RPG	APG	SPG	BPG	PPG
2020–21	Boston	46	1	14.5	.438	.370	.786	2.8	.5	.3	.2	4.7
2021–22	Boston	52	3	11.0	.396	.270	.808	1.7	.4	.4	.1	3.8
2022–23	Indiana	**73**	**60**	24.9	.427	.366	.838	3.8	1.3	.8	.5	10.1
2023–24	Indiana	72	47	27.7	.496	.419	.781	3.8	1.5	**.9**	**.7**	12.2
2024–25	Indiana	45	37	25.0	**.507**	**.431**	**.913**	4.0	1.2	.8	.4	12.0
2025–26	Indiana	45	42	**29.7**	.414	.379	.829	**4.2**	**1.9**	.6	.5	**13.8**
Career		333	190	22.6	.453	.383	.828	3.4	1.2	.6	.4	9.6

==== Playoffs ====
Year	Team	GP	GS	MPG	FG%	3P%	FT%	RPG	APG	SPG	BPG	PPG
2021	Boston	5	0	15.0	.278	.286	**1.000**	2.6	.2	.2	.2	3.2
2022	Boston	15	0	3.5	.235	.091	.750	1.0	.2	.1	.3	.8
2024	Indiana	17	17	**32.9**	.433	.278	.919	4.9	**2.2**	.6	.5	10.5
2025	Indiana	**23***	**23***	28.3	**.472**	**.492**	.861	**5.7**	1.1	**.9**	**.8**	**12.7**
Career		60	40	22.3	.438	.385	.886	4.0	1.1	.6	.5	8.3

=== College ===
Year	Team	GP	GS	MPG	FG%	3P%	FT%	RPG	APG	SPG	BPG	PPG
2018–19	Vanderbilt	**32**	**19**	29.0	.392	.337	**.825**	**5.5**	**1.4**	.7	.6	11.0
2019–20	Vanderbilt	14	14	**35.7**	**.512**	**.522**	**.825**	4.9	.9	**1.4**	**.9**	**23.0**
Career		46	33	31.0	.442	.410	.825	5.3	1.3	.9	.7	14.7
