= Daniel Theis =

German basketball player (born 1992)

- Theis with Maccabi Tel Aviv, November 2026

No. 23 – Maccabi Tel Aviv
- Position: Center
- League: Israeli Premier League; EuroLeague

Personal information
- Born: 4 April 1992 (age 34) Salzgitter, Germany
- Listed height: 2.03 m (6 ft 8 in)
- Listed weight: 110 kg (243 lb)

Career information
- NBA draft: 2013: undrafted
- Playing career: 2010–present

Career history
- 2010–2012: Phantoms Braunschweig
- 2010–2012: →SG Braunschweig
- 2012–2014: Ratiopharm Ulm
- 2014–2017: Brose Bamberg
- 2017–2021: Boston Celtics
- 2021: Chicago Bulls
- 2021–2022: Houston Rockets
- 2022: Boston Celtics
- 2022–2023: Indiana Pacers
- 2023–2024: Los Angeles Clippers
- 2024–2025: New Orleans Pelicans
- 2025–2026: AS Monaco
- 2026–present: Maccabi Tel Aviv

Career highlights
- 3× Bundesliga champion (2015–2017); German Cup winner (2017); German Supercup winner (2015); Bundesliga Best Defender (2017); 4× German All-Star (2014–2017); Bundesliga Most Effective German Player (2016); All-Bundesliga Second Team (2016); Bundesliga Best Young Player (2014); LNB Élite champion (2026); French Cup winner (2026); French League Cup winner (2026); French Supercup winner (2025)
- Stats at NBA.com
- Stats at Basketball Reference
Medals
Men's basketball
Representing Germany
FIBA World Cup
Gold medal – first place	2023 Philippines–Japan–Indonesia
EuroBasket
Gold medal – first place	2025 Cyprus–Finland–Poland–Latvia
Bronze medal – third place	2022 Czech Republic–Georgia–Italy–Germany

Daniel Theis (/taɪs/; born 4 April 1992) is a German professional basketball player for Maccabi Tel Aviv of the Israeli Premier League and the EuroLeague. After seven seasons in the Basketball Bundesliga where he was a four-time All Star and three-time champion, Theis signed with the Boston Celtics of the NBA where he played for four seasons before a trade brought him to the Chicago Bulls in March 2021. The Bulls traded Theis to the Houston Rockets in August 2021, who in turn traded Theis back to the Celtics in February 2022, before being traded to the Indiana Pacers in July 2022. He reached the NBA Finals during his second stint with the Celtics.

== Early life ==
Born in Salzgitter, Theis went through the Braunschweig youth system.

== Professional career ==
=== Phantoms Braunschweig (2010–2012) ===
Theis made his debut in the German top-tier level league, the Basketball Bundesliga, during the 2010–11 season. Theis primarily gained playing time with Braunschweig's development squad, where he played alongside his older brother, Frank, from 2010 to 2012. He earned the Eurobasket.com website's All-2.Pro B Most Improved Player of the Year honors in 2011. In Braunschweig, Theis was also a teammate of fellow future NBA player Dennis Schröder.

=== Ratiopharm Ulm (2012–2014) ===
In the 2013–14 season, while with Ratiopharm Ulm, Theis won the BBL Best Young Player award.

=== Brose Bamberg (2014–2017) ===
Following his breakout season with Ulm, Theis signed with fellow German Bundesliga club Brose Bamberg. In the 2014 off-season, he played in the 2014 NBA Summer League for the Washington Wizards' summer league team.

In the 2014–15 season, Theis won his first German League championship with Brose Baskets. Brose beat FC Bayern Munich 3–2 in the German League Finals. In April 2015, he signed a fresh two-year deal with the Bamberg team, and he won two more German championships with Bamberg, in 2016 and 2017.

=== Boston Celtics (2017–2021) ===
On 20 July 2017, Theis signed with the Boston Celtics. He made his NBA debut on 18 October against the Milwaukee Bucks. On 12 March 2018, Theis suffered a torn meniscus in his left knee, and missed the remainder of the 2017–18 season after Theis repaired his left knee lateral meniscus in a surgery.

On 29 October 2018, Theis was found to have a slight tear of the plantar fascia in his right foot and was scheduled to be out indefinitely, but he returned shortly after the injury on 11 November against the Portland Trail Blazers.

On 17 July 2019, the Celtics announced that they had re-signed Theis, along with former Brose Bamberg teammate Brad Wanamaker. The contract was reported to be worth $10 million in total for the 2019–20 and 2020–21 seasons.

Theis started 64 games at center for the Celtics during the 2019–20 season. On 21 February 2020, Theis had a career-high 25 points and 16 rebounds in a win against the Minnesota Timberwolves. Celtics coach Brad Stevens said that Theis complemented the rest of the starters, playing in a way that "fits the other guys perfect."

=== Chicago Bulls (2021) ===
On 25 March 2021, Theis was traded to the Chicago Bulls in a three-team trade involving the Washington Wizards. By 12 April, he had worked his way into the starting lineup against the Memphis Grizzlies. On 26 April Theis scored 23 points and had 12 rebounds and 5 assists in a 110–102 victory against the Miami Heat.

=== Houston Rockets (2021–2022) ===
On 7 August 2021, Theis was traded to the Houston Rockets via a sign-and-trade deal.

=== Return to the Celtics (2022) ===
On 10 February 2022, the Boston Celtics re-acquired Theis from the Rockets in exchange for Bruno Fernando, Enes Freedom, and Dennis Schröder. Theis and the Celtics reached the NBA Finals, but lost to the Golden State Warriors in 6 games.

=== Indiana Pacers (2022–2023) ===
On 9 July 2022, Theis was traded, alongside Nik Stauskas, Aaron Nesmith, Malik Fitts, Juwan Morgan and a 2023 first-round pick, to the Indiana Pacers in exchange for Malcolm Brogdon. On 2 February 2023, after missing over 50 games due to knee surgery, Theis made his Pacers debut against the Los Angeles Lakers. On 13 February against the Utah Jazz, Theis recorded a season–high 11 points, five rebounds, and three assists as the Pacers' starting center. Theis spent his first season in Indiana as a mentor and backup to Myles Turner, Jalen Smith, and Isaiah Jackson before falling out of the Pacers rotation.

On 15 November 2023, Theis reached a buyout agreement with Indiana after seeing minimal action to start the 2023–24 Pacers season.

=== Los Angeles Clippers (2023–2024) ===
On 17 November 2023, Theis signed with the Los Angeles Clippers.

=== New Orleans Pelicans (2024–2025) ===
On 9 July 2024, Theis signed with the New Orleans Pelicans.

On 5 February 2025, Theis was traded alongside a 2031 second-round pick to the Oklahoma City Thunder in exchange for cash considerations. The next day, he was waived by the Thunder.

=== AS Monaco (2025–2026) ===
On 17 February 2025, AS Monaco announced that Theis had inked a contract for the rest of the 2024–25 season and for the following campaign. During his stint with Monaco, he helped the team secure the 2026 LNB Élite championship, the French Basketball Cup title, and the French League Cup.

=== Maccabi Tel Aviv (2026–present) ===
Theis with Maccabi Tel Aviv in 2026

On 5 August 2026, Theis signed a two-year deal with Maccabi Tel Aviv of the Israeli Premier League and the EuroLeague.

== National team career ==
Theis was a member of the junior national teams of Germany. With the Germany U20 national team, he played at the 2011 FIBA U20 European Championship, and the 2012 FIBA U20 European Championship.

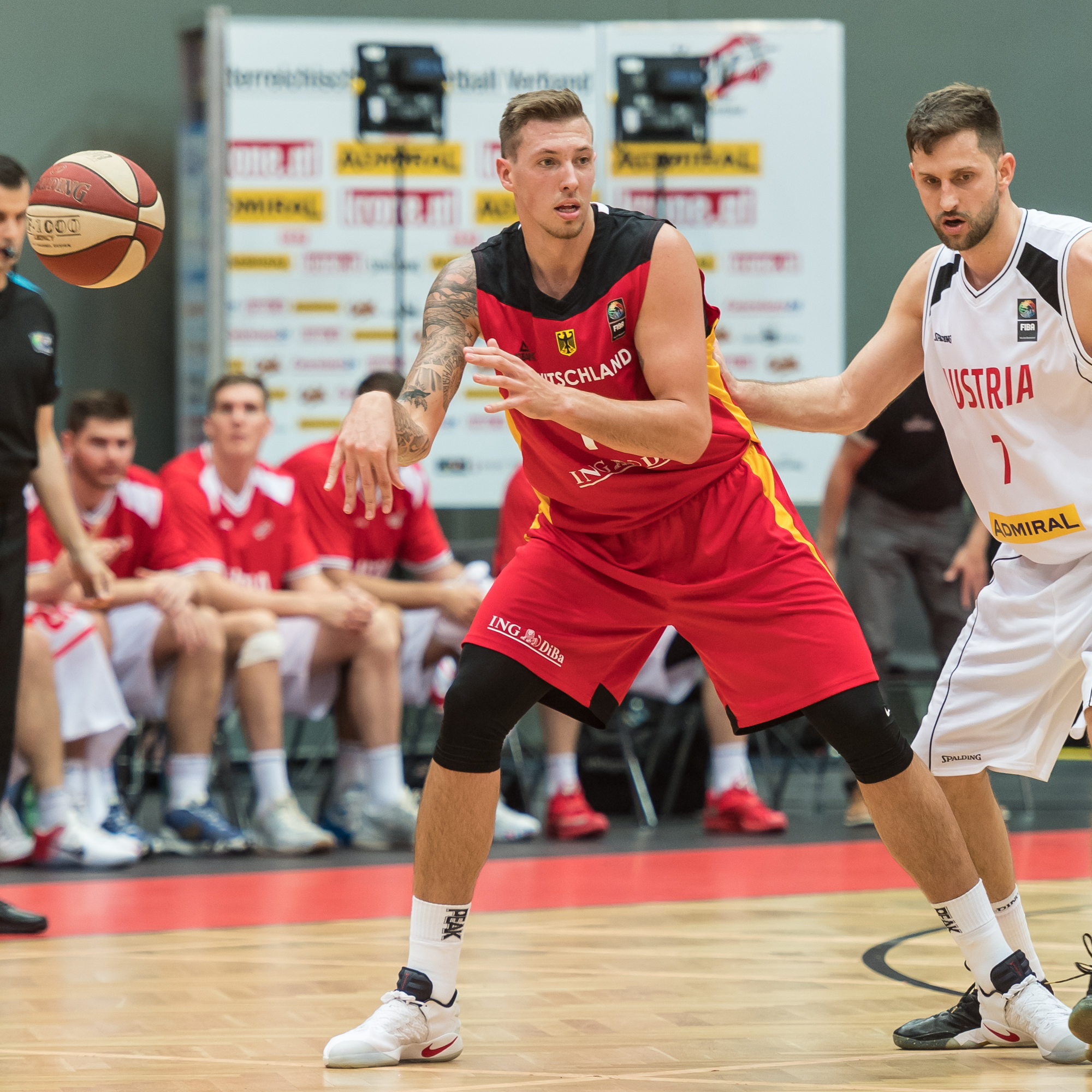
Theis with the Germany national team in a EuroBasket 2017 qualifier in 2016.

On 27 July 2014, Theis made his first appearance with the senior Germany national team in a game against Finland. With Germany's senior team, he played in the EuroBasket 2015 qualification tournament. Two years later, Theis was selected to represent Germany at the EuroBasket 2017, where he averaged 10.9 points and 6.3 rebounds per game during the competition.

At the 2019 FIBA World Cup, Theis finished the event with averages of 7.6 points and 6 rebounds per game. Heading toward EuroBasket 2022, Theis helped Germany win bronze during the tournament, finishing with 8.8 points, 6.1 rebounds and 1.3 assists per game.

The following year, Theis played a pivotal role in helping Germany capture their first world title at the 2023 FIBA World Cup. He attained averages of 10.9 points, 5.4 rebounds and 1.9 assists per game. In 2024, Theis was part of the Germany team that reached the semi-finals of the 2024 Olympic Games, where he averaged 7.8 points and seven rebounds per game.

In September 2025, Theis helped Germany win their second European title all-time at EuroBasket 2025, averaging 10.2 points and 6.4 rebounds per game.

== Career statistics ==
Legend
GP	Games played	GS	Games started	MPG	Minutes per game
FG%	Field-goal percentage	3P%	3-point field-goal percentage	FT%	Free-throw percentage
RPG	Rebounds per game	APG	Assists per game	SPG	Steals per game
BPG	Blocks per game	PPG	Points per game	PIR	Performance index rating
**Bold**	Career high

=== NBA ===
==== Regular season ====
Year	Team	GP	GS	MPG	FG%	3P%	FT%	RPG	APG	SPG	BPG	PPG
2017–18	Boston	63	3	14.9	.541	.310	.753	4.3	.9	.5	.8	5.3
2018–19	Boston	**66**	2	13.8	.549	**.388**	.737	3.4	1.0	.3	.6	5.7
2019–20	Boston	65	**64**	24.1	.566	.333	.763	**6.6**	1.7	.6	**1.3**	9.2
2020–21	Boston	42	37	24.4	.552	.347	.687	5.2	1.6	.6	1.0	9.5
2020–21	Chicago	23	14	**24.9**	.522	.281	.651	5.9	**1.8**	**.7**	.6	**10.0**
2021–22	Houston	26	21	22.5	.469	.291	.675	5.0	.8	.4	.7	8.4
2021–22	Boston	21	6	18.7	**.598**	.357	.688	4.7	1.0	.4	.7	7.9
2022–23	Indiana	7	1	15.5	.477	.182	.417	3.1	1.3	.3	.9	7.0
2023–24	Indiana	1	0	8.4	.250	.000	—	.0	.0	.0	.0	2.0
2023–24	L.A. Clippers	59	3	17.1	.536	.371	.760	4.1	1.0	.4	.9	6.3
2024–25	New Orleans	38	9	16.3	.473	.243	**.838**	4.3	1.6	.5	.5	4.3
Career		411	160	18.8	.537	.326	.726	4.7	1.3	.5	.8	7.1

==== Playoffs ====
Year	Team	GP	GS	MPG	FG%	3P%	FT%	RPG	APG	SPG	BPG	PPG
2019	Boston	7	0	6.0	.357	.000	**1.000**	1.4	.0	.1	.1	1.7
2020	Boston	**17**	**17**	**28.4**	.521	.154	.788	**7.1**	**1.5**	**.4**	**1.2**	**8.9**
2022	Boston	16	5	12.5	.588	.214	.750	3.3	.7	.3	.5	4.3
2024	L.A. Clippers	1	0	4.4	**1.000**	**1.000**	—	1.0	.0	.0	.0	3.0
Career		41	22	17.8	.530	.186	.791	4.5	.9	.3	.7	5.8

=== EuroLeague ===
Year	Team	GP	GS	MPG	FG%	3P%	FT%	RPG	APG	SPG	BPG	PPG	PIR
2015–16	Brose Bamberg	24	**1**	19.6	.536	.389	**.764**	4.4	.5	.5	.6	9.2	9.4
2016–17	Brose Bamberg	**30**	**1**	**19.7**	**.598**	**.410**	.709	**4.6**	**.7**	**.7**	**.9**	**9.6**	**10.7**
Career		54	2	19.7	.571	.400	.736	4.5	.6	.6	.8	9.4	10.1
