= 2020–21 Boston Celtics season =

- Head coach: Brad Stevens
- General manager: Danny Ainge
- Owners: Wyc Grousbeck
- Arena: TD Garden

Results
- Record: 36–36 (.500)
- Place: Division: 4th (Atlantic); Conference: 7th (Eastern)
- Playoff finish: First round (lost to Nets 1–4)
- Stats at Basketball Reference

Local media
- Television: NBC Sports Boston
- Radio: WBZ-FM

The 2020–21 Boston Celtics season was the Celtics' 75th season in the National Basketball Association (NBA). As a result of the COVID-19 pandemic, the regular season for the league began on December 22, 2020, and featured a 72-game schedule rather than the typical 82-game schedule. The Celtics finished the regular season with a 36–36 record, and clinched a playoff spot after defeating the Washington Wizards with a score of 118–100 in the play-in tournament.

In the opening round of the playoffs, the Celtics were defeated by the Brooklyn Nets in five games, marking the first time the Celtics were eliminated in the first round since 2016. Following the season, Danny Ainge left his position as general manager, and named head coach Brad Stevens as his replacement.

This was the last season where the Celtics did not reach the Eastern Conference Finals until 2025.

== Draft picks ==
Round	Pick	Player	Position	Nationality	College/Club
1	14	Aaron Nesmith	SF	United States	Vanderbilt
1	26	Payton Pritchard	PG	United States	Oregon
2	47	Yam Madar	PG	Israel	Hapoel Tel Aviv

== Roster ==
2020–21 Boston Celtics roster
Players

Pos.	No.	Player	Height	Weight	DOB	From
G/F	7	Jaylen Brown (injured)	6 ft 6 in (1.98 m)	223 lb (101 kg)	1996-10-24	California
G	4	Carsen Edwards	5 ft 11 in (1.80 m)	200 lb (91 kg)	1998-03-12	Purdue
C	99	Tacko Fall (TW)	7 ft 5 in (2.26 m)	311 lb (141 kg)	1995-12-10	Central Florida
G/F	94	Evan Fournier	6 ft 7 in (2.01 m)	205 lb (93 kg)	1992-10-29	France
F/C	40	Luke Kornet	7 ft 2 in (2.18 m)	250 lb (113 kg)	1995-07-15	Vanderbilt
G	45	Romeo Langford	6 ft 4 in (1.93 m)	216 lb (98 kg)	1999-10-25	Indiana
G/F	26	Aaron Nesmith	6 ft 5 in (1.96 m)	215 lb (98 kg)	1999-10-16	Vanderbilt
F	37	Semi Ojeleye	6 ft 6 in (1.98 m)	240 lb (109 kg)	1994-12-05	SMU
F	20	Jabari Parker	6 ft 8 in (2.03 m)	245 lb (111 kg)	1995-05-15	Duke
G	11	Payton Pritchard	6 ft 1 in (1.85 m)	195 lb (88 kg)	1998-01-28	Oregon
G	36	Marcus Smart	6 ft 3 in (1.91 m)	220 lb (100 kg)	1994-03-06	Oklahoma State
F	0	Jayson Tatum	6 ft 8 in (2.03 m)	210 lb (95 kg)	1998-03-03	Duke
C	13	Tristan Thompson	6 ft 9 in (2.06 m)	254 lb (115 kg)	1991-03-13	Texas
G	8	Kemba Walker	6 ft 0 in (1.83 m)	184 lb (83 kg)	1990-05-08	Connecticut
G	51	Tremont Waters (TW)	5 ft 10 in (1.78 m)	175 lb (79 kg)	1998-01-10	LSU
F	12	Grant Williams	6 ft 6 in (1.98 m)	236 lb (107 kg)	1998-11-30	Tennessee
C	44	Robert Williams III	6 ft 9 in (2.06 m)	237 lb (108 kg)	1997-10-17	Texas A&M

Coaches
Head coach
- Brad Stevens
Assistant(s)
- Jerome Allen
- Brandon Bailey
- Jay Larranaga
- Joe Mazzulla
- Scott Morrison
- Evan Turner
- Jamie Young

Legend
- (DP) Unsigned draft pick
- (FA) Free agent
- (S) Suspended
- (GL) On assignment to G League affiliate
- (TW) Two-way affiliate player
- Injured

Roster
Updated: June 2, 2021

== Standings ==
=== Division ===
Atlantic Division	W	L	PCT	GB	Home	Road	Div	GP
c − Philadelphia 76ers	49	23	.681	–	29‍–‍7	20‍–‍16	10–2	72
x – Brooklyn Nets	48	24	.667	1.0	28‍–‍8	20‍–‍16	8–4	72
x – New York Knicks	41	31	.569	8.0	25‍–‍11	16‍–‍20	4–8	72
x – Boston Celtics	36	36	.500	13.0	21‍–‍15	15‍–‍21	4–8	72
Toronto Raptors	27	45	.375	22.0	16‍–‍20	11‍–‍25	4–8	72

=== Conference ===
Eastern Conference
#	Team	W	L	PCT	GB	GP
1	c − Philadelphia 76ers *	49	23	.681	–	72
2	x – Brooklyn Nets	48	24	.667	1.0	72
3	y – Milwaukee Bucks *	46	26	.639	3.0	72
4	x – New York Knicks	41	31	.569	8.0	72
5	y – Atlanta Hawks *	41	31	.569	8.0	72
6	x – Miami Heat	40	32	.556	9.0	72
7	x – Boston Celtics	36	36	.500	13.0	72
8	x – Washington Wizards	34	38	.472	15.0	72
9	pi – Indiana Pacers	34	38	.472	15.0	72
10	pi – Charlotte Hornets	33	39	.458	16.0	72
11	Chicago Bulls	31	41	.431	18.0	72
12	Toronto Raptors	27	45	.375	22.0	72
13	Cleveland Cavaliers	22	50	.306	27.0	72
14	Orlando Magic	21	51	.292	28.0	72
15	Detroit Pistons	20	52	.278	29.0	72

Notes

- z – Clinched home court advantage for the entire playoffs
- c – Clinched home court advantage for the conference playoffs
- y – Clinched division title
- x – Clinched playoff spot
- * – Division leader

== Game log ==
=== Preseason ===
2020 preseason game log
Total: 0–2 (home: 0–1; road: 0–1)
Preseason: 0–2 (home: 0–1; road: 0–1)

Game	Date	Team	Score	High points	High rebounds	High assists	Location Attendance	Record
1	December 15	@ Philadelphia	L 99–108	Jeff Teague (18)	Jaylen Brown (8)	Waters, G. Williams (3)	Wells Fargo Center	0–1
2	December 18	Brooklyn	L 89–113	Jayson Tatum (19)	Daniel Theis (9)	Tremont Waters (5)	TD Garden	0–2

2020–21 season schedule

=== Regular season ===
2020–21 game log
Total: 36–36 (home: 21–15; road: 15–21)
December: 3–2 (home: 2–1; road: 1–1)

Game	Date	Team	Score	High points	High rebounds	High assists	Location Attendance	Record
1	December 23	Milwaukee	W 122–121	Jaylen Brown (33)	Tristan Thompson (8)	Marcus Smart (7)	TD Garden; 0	1–0
2	December 25	Brooklyn	L 95–123	Jaylen Brown (27)	Brown, Tatum, Thompson (8)	Marcus Smart (6)	TD Garden; 0	1–1
3	December 27	@ Indiana	L 107–108	Jayson Tatum (25)	Jayson Tatum (11)	Marcus Smart (6)	Bankers Life Fieldhouse; 0	1–2
4	December 29	@ Indiana	W 116–111	Jayson Tatum (27)	Jayson Tatum (11)	Pritchard, Smart (6)	Bankers Life Fieldhouse; 0	2–2
5	December 30	Memphis	W 126–107	Jaylen Brown (42)	Robert Williams III (10)	Brown, Smart, Teague (4)	TD Garden; 0	3–2

January: 7–6 (home: 3–2; road: 4–4)

Game	Date	Team	Score	High points	High rebounds	High assists	Location Attendance	Record
6	January 1	@ Detroit	L 93–96	Jayson Tatum (28)	Brown, Thompson (9)	Marcus Smart (9)	Little Caesars Arena; 0	3–3
7	January 3	@ Detroit	W 122–120	Jaylen Brown (31)	Tristan Thompson (11)	Jayson Tatum (12)	Little Caesars Arena; 0	4–3
8	January 4	@ Toronto	W 126–114	Jayson Tatum (40)	Robert Williams III (15)	Payton Pritchard (8)	Amalie Arena; 3,740	5–3
9	January 6	@ Miami	W 107–105	Jayson Tatum (27)	Jaylen Brown (12)	Marcus Smart (6)	AmericanAirlines Arena; 0	6–3
10	January 8	Washington	W 116–107	Jayson Tatum (32)	Jaylen Brown (13)	Brown, Smart (5)	TD Garden; 0	7–3
–	January 10	Miami	Postponed (COVID-19) (Makeup date: May 11)					
–	January 12	@ Chicago	Postponed (COVID-19) (Makeup date: May 7)					
–	January 13	Orlando	Postponed (COVID-19) (Makeup date: March 21)					
11	January 15	Orlando	W 124–97	Jaylen Brown (21)	Tristan Thompson (11)	Jaylen Brown (8)	TD Garden; 0	8–3
12	January 17	New York	L 75–105	Jaylen Brown (25)	Daniel Theis (7)	Kemba Walker (4)	TD Garden; 0	8–4
13	January 20	@ Philadelphia	L 109–117	Jaylen Brown (26)	Daniel Theis (10)	Kemba Walker (6)	Wells Fargo Center; 0	8–5
14	January 22	@ Philadelphia	L 110–122	Jaylen Brown (42)	Jaylen Brown (9)	Marcus Smart (7)	Wells Fargo Center; 0	8–6
15	January 24	Cleveland	W 141–103	Jaylen Brown (33)	Tristan Thompson (12)	Marcus Smart (9)	TD Garden; 0	9–6
16	January 25	@ Chicago	W 119–103	Jaylen Brown (26)	Tristan Thompson (10)	Marcus Smart (11)	United Center; 0	10–6
17	January 27	@ San Antonio	L 106–110	Jayson Tatum (25)	Tristan Thompson (8)	Jaylen Brown (5)	AT&T Center; 0	10–7
18	January 30	L. A. Lakers	L 95–96	Jayson Tatum (30)	Jayson Tatum (9)	Marcus Smart (7)	TD Garden; 0	10–8

February: 7–9 (home: 5–2; road: 2–7)

Game	Date	Team	Score	High points	High rebounds	High assists	Location Attendance	Record
19	February 2	@ Golden State	W 111–107	Jayson Tatum (27)	Daniel Theis (11)	Kemba Walker (5)	Chase Center; 0	11–8
20	February 3	@ Sacramento	L 111–116	Jayson Tatum (27)	Tristan Thompson (10)	Jayson Tatum (10)	Golden 1 Center; 0	11–9
21	February 5	@ L. A. Clippers	W 119–115	Jayson Tatum (34)	Tatum, Thompson (7)	Teague, Walker (4)	Staples Center; 0	12–9
22	February 7	@ Phoenix	L 91–100	Jayson Tatum (23)	Tristan Thompson (12)	Jayson Tatum (7)	Phoenix Suns Arena; 1,493	12–10
23	February 9	@ Utah	L 108–122	Jaylen Brown (33)	Jaylen Brown (8)	Kemba Walker (7)	Vivint Arena; 3,902	12–11
24	February 11	Toronto	W 120–106	Semi Ojeleye (24)	Tristan Thompson (11)	Jaylen Brown (10)	TD Garden; 0	13–11
25	February 12	Detroit	L 102–108	Jayson Tatum (33)	Jayson Tatum (11)	Jayson Tatum (7)	TD Garden; 0	13–12
26	February 14	@ Washington	L 91–104	Brown, Walker (25)	Brown, Walker (7)	Jayson Tatum (4)	Capital One Arena; 0	13–13
27	February 16	Denver	W 122–99	Jaylen Brown (27)	Tristan Thompson (12)	Jayson Tatum (8)	TD Garden; 0	14–13
28	February 17	Atlanta	L 114–122	Jayson Tatum (35)	Tristan Thompson (7)	Jayson Tatum (6)	TD Garden; 0	14–14
29	February 19	Atlanta	W 121–109	Kemba Walker (28)	Tatum, Theis (8)	Brown, Tatum, Walker (6)	TD Garden; 0	15–14
30	February 21	@ New Orleans	L 115–120	Jayson Tatum (32)	Robert Williams III (13)	Jaylen Brown (9)	Smoothie King Center; 1,940	15–15
31	February 23	@ Dallas	L 107–110	Jaylen Brown (29)	Tristan Thompson (10)	Jaylen Brown (5)	American Airlines Center; 3,338	15–16
32	February 24	@ Atlanta	L 112–127	Jaylen Brown (17)	Tristan Thompson (13)	Brown, Teague (5)	State Farm Arena; 1,537	15–17
33	February 26	Indiana	W 118–112	Kemba Walker (32)	Robert Williams III (11)	Kemba Walker (6)	TD Garden; 0	16–17
34	February 28	Washington	W 111–110	Jayson Tatum (31)	Tristan Thompson (13)	Kemba Walker (8)	TD Garden; 0	17–17

March: 6–8 (home: 3–4; road: 3–4)

Game	Date	Team	Score	High points	High rebounds	High assists	Location Attendance	Record
35	March 2	L. A. Clippers	W 117–112	Kemba Walker (25)	Tristan Thompson (9)	Kemba Walker (6)	TD Garden; 0	18–17
36	March 4	Toronto	W 132–125	Jayson Tatum (27)	Jayson Tatum (12)	Kemba Walker (6)	TD Garden; 0	19–17
All-Star Break
37	March 11	@ Brooklyn	L 109–121	Jayson Tatum (31)	Daniel Theis (8)	Jaylen Brown (6)	Barclays Center; 1,374	19–18
38	March 14	@ Houston	W 134–107	Jaylen Brown (24)	Thompson, Williams III (13)	Jayson Tatum (6)	Toyota Center; 3,264	20–18
39	March 16	Utah	L 109–117	Jayson Tatum (29)	Daniel Theis (11)	Jaylen Brown (7)	TD Garden; 0	20–19
40	March 17	@ Cleveland	L 110–117	Jayson Tatum (29)	Robert Williams III (14)	Daniel Theis (5)	Rocket Mortgage FieldHouse; 4,100	20–20
41	March 19	Sacramento	L 96–107	Jaylen Brown (19)	Jaylen Brown (11)	Kemba Walker (7)	TD Garden; 0	20–21
42	March 21	Orlando	W 112–96	Jaylen Brown (34)	Daniel Theis (11)	Marcus Smart (8)	TD Garden; 0	21–21
43	March 22	@ Memphis	L 126–132 (OT)	Jaylen Brown (27)	Jaylen Brown (9)	Jeff Teague (6)	FedExForum; 2,319	21–22
44	March 24	@ Milwaukee	L 119–121	Jaylen Brown (24)	Jaylen Brown (10)	Smart, Walker (6)	Fiserv Forum; 3,280	21–23
45	March 26	@ Milwaukee	W 122–114	Jayson Tatum (34)	Robert Williams III (9)	Jayson Tatum (7)	Fiserv Forum; 3,280	22–23
46	March 27	@ Oklahoma City	W 111–94	Jayson Tatum (27)	Robert Williams III (14)	Marcus Smart (8)	Chesapeake Energy Arena; 0	23–23
47	March 29	New Orleans	L 109–115	Jayson Tatum (34)	Robert Williams III (10)	Tatum, Williams III (5)	TD Garden; 2,298	23–24
48	March 31	Dallas	L 108–113	Jayson Tatum (25)	Jayson Tatum (9)	Marcus Smart (7)	TD Garden; 2,298	23–25

April: 11–5 (home: 8–3; road: 3–2)

Game	Date	Team	Score	High points	High rebounds	High assists	Location Attendance	Record
49	April 2	Houston	W 118–102	Jayson Tatum (26)	Jaylen Brown (11)	Marcus Smart (10)	TD Garden; 0	24–25
50	April 4	Charlotte	W 116–86	Jayson Tatum (22)	Tatum, Williams III (8)	Walker, Fournier (6)	TD Garden; 0	25–25
51	April 6	Philadelphia	L 96–106	Jayson Tatum (20)	Robert Williams III (9)	Kemba Walker (6)	TD Garden; 2,298	25–26
52	April 7	New York	W 101–99	Jaylen Brown (32)	Brown, Tatum, Williams III (10)	Marcus Smart (9)	TD Garden; 2,298	26–26
53	April 9	Minnesota	W 145–136 (OT)	Jayson Tatum (53)	Jayson Tatum (10)	Kemba Walker (9)	TD Garden; 2,298	27–26
54	April 11	@ Denver	W 105–87	Jayson Tatum (28)	Jayson Tatum (10)	Kemba Walker (6)	Ball Arena; 4,032	28–26
55	April 13	@ Portland	W 116–115	Jayson Tatum (32)	Jayson Tatum (9)	Smart, Walker (7)	Moda Center; 0	29–26
56	April 15	@ L. A. Lakers	W 121–113	Jaylen Brown (40)	Jaylen Brown (9)	Kemba Walker (7)	Staples Center; 1,915	30–26
57	April 17	Golden State	W 119–114	Jayson Tatum (44)	Jayson Tatum (10)	Marcus Smart (6)	TD Garden; 2,298	31–26
58	April 19	Chicago	L 96–102	Jaylen Brown (23)	Jayson Tatum (13)	Jayson Tatum (10)	TD Garden; 0	31–27
59	April 22	Phoenix	W 99–86	Kemba Walker (32)	Tristan Thompson (12)	Jayson Tatum (6)	TD Garden; 2,298	32–27
60	April 23	@ Brooklyn	L 104–109	Jayson Tatum (38)	Jayson Tatum (10)	Evan Fournier (5)	Barclays Center; 1,773	32–28
61	April 25	@ Charlotte	L 104–125	Brown, Walker (20)	Jayson Tatum (11)	Walker, Smart (4)	Spectrum Center; 4,493	32–29
62	April 27	Oklahoma City	L 115–119	Jaylen Brown (39)	Jaylen Brown (11)	Marcus Smart (6)	TD Garden; 2,298	32–30
63	April 28	Charlotte	W 120–111	Jaylen Brown (38)	Tristan Thompson (13)	Jayson Tatum (8)	TD Garden; 2,298	33–30
64	April 30	San Antonio	W 143–140 (OT)	Jayson Tatum (60)	Tristan Thompson (15)	Marcus Smart (12)	TD Garden; 2,298	34–30

May: 2–6 (home: 0–3; road: 2–3)

Game	Date	Team	Score	High points	High rebounds	High assists	Location Attendance	Record
65	May 2	Portland	L 119–129	Jayson Tatum (33)	Jaylen Brown (11)	Marcus Smart (8)	TD Garden; 0	34–31
66	May 5	@ Orlando	W 132–96	Kemba Walker (32)	Jayson Tatum (7)	Marcus Smart (9)	Amway Center; 4,249	35–31
67	May 7	@ Chicago	L 99–121	Kemba Walker (33)	Tristan Thompson (10)	Marcus Smart (5)	United Center; 3,399	35–32
68	May 9	Miami	L 124–130	Evan Fournier (30)	Tristan Thompson (12)	Evan Fournier (8)	TD Garden; 2,298	35–33
69	May 11	Miami	L 121–129	Kemba Walker (36)	Jayson Tatum (8)	Evan Fournier (8)	TD Garden; 4,789	35–34
70	May 12	@ Cleveland	L 94–102	Jayson Tatum (29)	Jayson Tatum (8)	Pritchard, Waters (3)	Rocket Mortgage FieldHouse; 4,148	35–35
71	May 15	@ Minnesota	W 124–108	Jayson Tatum (26)	Jayson Tatum (11)	Tremont Waters (7)	Target Center; 1,638	36–35
72	May 16	@ New York	L 92–96	Jabari Parker (18)	Tacko Fall (8)	Payton Pritchard (6)	Madison Square Garden; 1,981	36–36

2020–21 season schedule

=== Play-in ===
2021 play-in game log
Total: 1–0 (home: 1–0; road: 0–0)
Play-in: 1–0 (home: 1–0; road: 0–0)

Game	Date	Team	Score	High points	High rebounds	High assists	Location Attendance	Record
1	May 18	Washington	W 118–100	Jayson Tatum (50)	Tristan Thompson (12)	Marcus Smart (6)	TD Garden; 4,789	1–0

=== Playoffs ===
2021 playoff game log
Total: 1–4 (home: 1–1; road: 0–3)
First Round: 1–4 (home: 1–1; road: 0–3)

Game	Date	Team	Score	High points	High rebounds	High assists	Location Attendance	Series
1	May 22	@ Brooklyn	L 93–104	Jayson Tatum (22)	Tristan Thompson (10)	Smart, Tatum (5)	Barclays Center; 14,391	0–1
2	May 25	@ Brooklyn	L 108–130	Marcus Smart (19)	Tristan Thompson (11)	Kemba Walker (7)	Barclays Center; 14,774	0–2
3	May 28	Brooklyn	W 125–119	Jayson Tatum (50)	Tristan Thompson (13)	Jayson Tatum (7)	TD Garden; 4,789	1–2
4	May 30	Brooklyn	L 126–141	Jayson Tatum (40)	Jayson Tatum (7)	Marcus Smart (9)	TD Garden; 17,226	1–3
5	June 1	@ Brooklyn	L 109–123	Jayson Tatum (32)	Tatum, Thompson (9)	Jayson Tatum (5)	Barclays Center; 14,993	1–4

2021 playoff schedule

== Player statistics ==
Legend
GP	Games played	GS	Games started	MPG	Minutes per game
FG%	Field-goal percentage	3P%	3-point field-goal percentage	FT%	Free-throw percentage
RPG	Rebounds per game	APG	Assists per game	SPG	Steals per game
BPG	Blocks per game	PPG	Points per game

=== Regular season ===
Boston Celtics statistics
Player	GP	GS	MPG	FG%	3P%	FT%	RPG	APG	SPG	BPG	PPG
Payton Pritchard	66	4	19.2	.440	.411	.889	2.4	1.8	.6	.1	7.7
Jayson Tatum	64	64	35.8	.459	.386	.868	7.4	4.3	1.2	.5	26.4
Grant Williams	63	9	18.1	.437	.372	.588	2.8	1.0	.5	.4	4.7
Jaylen Brown	58	58	34.5	.484	.397	.764	6.0	3.4	1.2	.6	24.7
Semi Ojeleye	56	15	17.0	.403	.367	.750	2.6	.7	.3	.0	4.6
Tristan Thompson	54	43	23.8	.518	.000	.592	8.1	1.2	.4	.6	7.6
Robert Williams III	52	13	18.9	.721	.000	.616	6.9	1.8	.8	1.8	8.0
Marcus Smart	48	45	32.9	.398	.330	.790	3.5	5.7	1.5	.5	13.1
Aaron Nesmith	46	1	14.5	.438	.370	.786	2.8	.5	.3	.2	4.7
Kemba Walker	43	43	31.8	.420	.360	.899	4.0	4.9	1.1	.3	19.3
Daniel Theis^{†}	42	37	24.5	.552	.347	.687	5.2	1.6	.6	1.0	9.5
Jeff Teague^{†}	34	5	18.1	.415	.464	.836	1.7	2.1	.8	.2	6.9
Carsen Edwards	31	1	8.9	.423	.286	.846	.8	.5	.2	.0	4.0
Tremont Waters	26	3	9.2	.405	.395	.941	.8	2.4	.6	.0	3.8
Javonte Green^{†}	25	2	13.8	.549	.318	.667	2.1	.4	.7	.1	4.2
Tacko Fall	19	0	7.2	.724		.333	2.7	.2	.1	1.1	2.5
Romeo Langford	18	4	15.7	.356	.278	.750	1.9	.7	.3	.3	3.1
Luke Kornet^{†}	18	2	14.1	.473	.250	.500	2.9	1.1	.1	1.4	4.4
Evan Fournier^{†}	16	10	29.5	.448	.463	.714	3.3	3.1	1.3	.6	13.0
Jabari Parker^{†}	10	0	13.8	.542	.200	.769	3.6	1.0	.1	.4	6.4
Moritz Wagner^{†}	9	1	6.8	.286	.333	.500	2.1	.7	.0	.1	1.2

=== Playoffs ===
Boston Celtics statistics
Player	GP	GS	MPG	FG%	3P%	FT%	RPG	APG	SPG	BPG	PPG
Jayson Tatum	5	5	37.0	.423	.389	.918	5.8	4.6	1.2	1.6	30.6
Marcus Smart	5	5	36.6	.439	.372	.714	4.4	6.0	1.0	.2	17.8
Evan Fournier	5	5	33.4	.429	.433	.833	3.6	1.4	1.2	.0	15.4
Tristan Thompson	5	5	26.4	.588		.706	9.8	1.0	.8	1.2	10.4
Aaron Nesmith	5	0	15.0	.278	.286	1.000	2.6	.2	.2	.2	3.2
Payton Pritchard	5	0	13.4	.353	.300	1.000	1.8	2.4	.4	.0	3.4
Grant Williams	5	0	11.4	.500	.500	1.000	2.0	.8	.2	.8	3.4
Romeo Langford	4	2	27.3	.406	.353	1.000	2.5	1.3	.8	.5	9.0
Jabari Parker	4	0	14.8	.619	.400	.750	3.8	.5	.0	.8	8.5
Kemba Walker	3	3	30.3	.317	.176	.900	4.0	4.0	.3	.0	12.7
Robert Williams III	3	0	15.3	.643		.500	5.0	.7	.3	3.0	6.3
Tremont Waters	3	0	2.0	.250	.000	.667	.0	.7	.3	.0	1.3
Semi Ojeleye	2	0	6.0	.000	.000	.500	.0	.0	.5	.5	.5
Carsen Edwards	2	0	2.5	.667	.500		.5	.0	.0	.0	2.5
Luke Kornet	2	0	2.5	1.000		.500	1.5	.0	.0	.0	1.5
Tacko Fall	1	0	1.0				1.0	.0	.0	.0	.0

- ^{†} Denotes player spent time with another team in the season. Stats reflect time with the Celtics only.

== Transactions ==
=== Trades ===
November 19, 2020	To Boston Celtics 2021 OKC protected second-round pick	To Oklahoma City Thunder Vincent Poirier cash considerations
November 20, 2020	To Boston Celtics 2023 second-round pick (from Memphis); 2025 MEM second-round pick (from Memphis)	To Memphis Grizzlies Mario Hezonja (from Portland); Draft rights to Desmond Bane (#30) (from Boston)
November 20, 2020	To Portland Trail Blazers Enes Kanter (from Boston) cash considerations (from Memphis)
November 29, 2020	To Boston Celtics 2022 CHA protected second-round pick	To Charlotte Hornets Gordon Hayward (sign and trade); 2023 BOS second-round pick 2024 BOS second-round pick
March 25, 2021	To Boston Celtics Evan Fournier	To Orlando Magic Jeff Teague; 2025 BOS second-round pick 2027 BOS second-round pick
March 25, 2021	To Boston Celtics Luke Kornet (from Chicago); Moritz Wagner (from Washington)	To Chicago Bulls Troy Brown Jr. (from Washington); Javonte Green (from Boston); Daniel Theis (from Boston); Cash considerations (from Boston and Washington)
March 25, 2021	To Washington Wizards Daniel Gafford (from Chicago); Chandler Hutchison (from Chicago)

== Free agency ==
=== Re-signed ===
Player	Signed
Tacko Fall	November 23

=== Additions ===
Player	Signed	Former Team
Jeff Teague	November 30	Atlanta Hawks
Tristan Thompson	November 30	Cleveland Cavaliers
Jabari Parker	April 16	Sacramento Kings

=== Subtractions ===
Player	Reason	New Team
Brad Wanamaker	Free agency	Golden State Warriors
