= Robert Williams III =

American basketball player (born 1997)

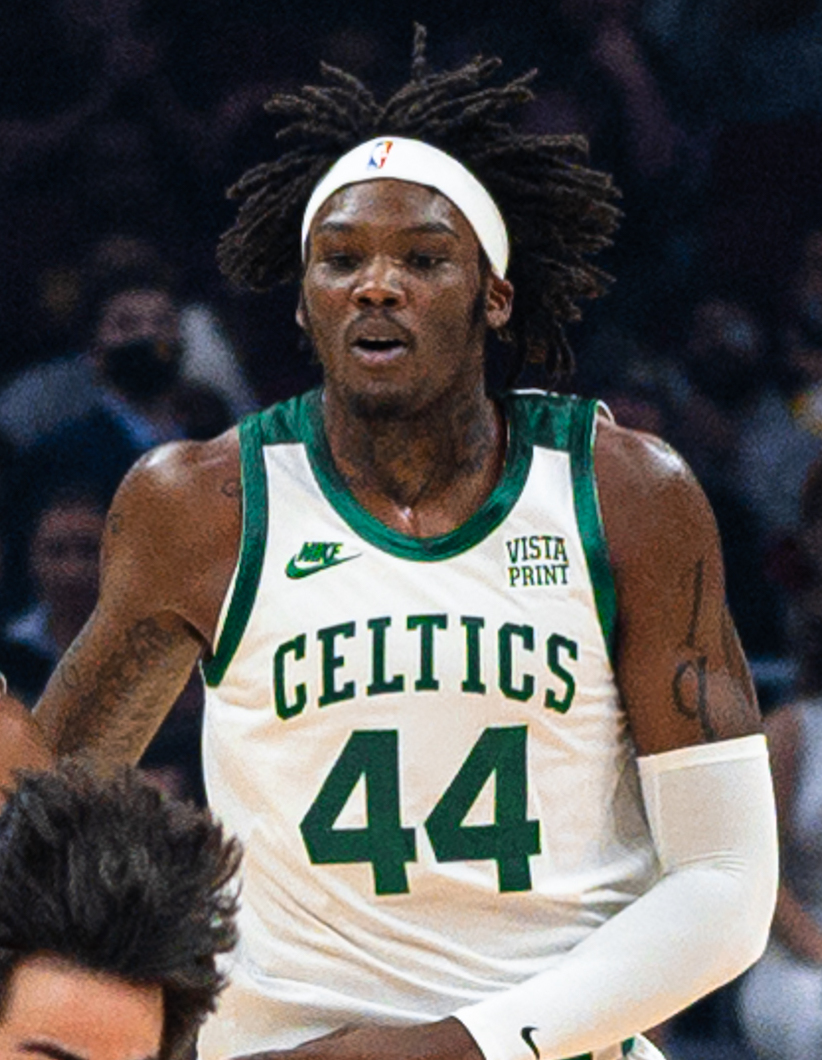
- Williams with the Boston Celtics in 2021

No. 35 – Portland Trail Blazers
- Position: Center / power forward
- League: NBA

Personal information
- Born: October 17, 1997 (age 29) Shreveport, Louisiana, U.S.
- Listed height: 6 ft 9 in (2.06 m)
- Listed weight: 249 lb (113 kg)

Career information
- High school: North Caddo (Vivian, Louisiana)
- College: Texas A&M (2016–2018)
- NBA draft: 2018: 1st round, 27th overall pick
- Drafted by: Boston Celtics
- Playing career: 2018–present

Career history
- 2018–2023: Boston Celtics
- 2018–2019: →Maine Red Claws
- 2023–present: Portland Trail Blazers

Career highlights
- NBA All-Defensive Second Team (2022); 2× SEC Defensive Player of the Year (2017, 2018); Second-team All-SEC (2017); SEC All-Freshman Team (2017); 2× SEC All-Defensive Team (2017, 2018)
- Stats at NBA.com
- Stats at Basketball Reference

Robert Lee Williams III (born October 17, 1997) is an American professional basketball player for the Portland Trail Blazers of the National Basketball Association (NBA). He played college basketball for the Texas A&M Aggies.

Williams was drafted 27th overall in the 2018 NBA draft by the Boston Celtics. He had a breakout season in 2021–22, which saw him being named to the NBA All-Defensive Second Team and reaching the NBA Finals as the Celtics' starting center.

== High school career ==
Williams attended North Caddo High School in Vivian, Louisiana. A consensus four-star recruit, he ranked 50th overall in ESPN’s Top 100 for the class of 2016 and was the number one prospect in the state of Louisiana. He committed to Texas A&M University to play college basketball.

== College career ==
In his first college game, he scored five points and had five blocks and seven rebounds. He was named SEC Defensive Player of the Year and earned Second-Team All-SEC honors after averaging 11.9 points and a team-high 8.2 rebounds per game as a freshman in 2016–17.

On March 21, despite being credited as a potential first-round lottery player, Williams decided to forgo the 2017 NBA draft and stay for another season at Texas A&M.

Following Texas A&M's loss in the 2018 NCAA men's basketball tournament, Williams announced his intention to forgo his final two seasons of collegiate eligibility and declare for the 2018 NBA draft, where he was expected to be a first-round selection. Williams was viewed as a potential lottery pick for the 2017 and 2018 NBA drafts.

== Professional career ==
=== Boston Celtics (2018–2023) ===
In the 2018 NBA draft, the Boston Celtics signed Williams as the 27th overall pick. Williams had fallen to 27th in the draft instead of a lottery pick due to concerns about his work ethic. He did not initially make a good impression, and faced criticism for showing up late and missing team functions. His reputation for missing flights and video meetings caused him to earn the moniker "Time Lord" on online Boston Celtics fandoms.

Williams made his professional debut on October 23, 2018, playing four minutes during the Celtics' loss to Orlando Magic, before being assigned to the Maine Red Claws on November 2. Throughout November and December, Williams split his time between the G League and the NBA, before starting to gain more game time with the Celtics following an injury to Al Horford. On December 11, 2018, Williams blocked two shots by NBA All Star Anthony Davis during a game against the New Orleans Pelicans. During the 2021 NBA playoffs, Williams dealt with a turf toe injury. In game 1 of the first-round series against the Brooklyn Nets, Williams blocked 9 shots to set a team playoff record for blocks in a game. He also scored 11 points and grabbed 9 rebounds. Despite this record, the team lost the game. The injury hobbled Williams for the remainder of the series and Williams left game 3 with a sprained ankle after playing just 6 minutes. He missed games 4 and 5, and the team lost the series 4–1. Following the season, Williams would sign a four-year, $54 million extension to keep him in Boston through the 2025–26 season.

On December 31, 2021, Williams recorded his first career triple-double, putting up 10 points, 11 rebounds and 10 assists, in a 123–108 win over the Phoenix Suns. On March 28, 2022, the Celtics announced that Williams had suffered a torn meniscus in his left knee and would be out indefinitely. Two days later, he underwent surgery and was ruled out for at least four-to-six weeks.

=== Portland Trail Blazers (2023–present) ===
==== 2023–24 ====
On October 1, 2023, Williams, along with Malcolm Brogdon and two future first-round draft picks, was traded to the Portland Trail Blazers in exchange for Jrue Holiday. On October 25, Williams made his Trail Blazers debut, putting up 10 points and seven rebounds off the bench in a 123–111 loss to the Los Angeles Clippers. But his season was cut short, suffering a patellar dislocation after colliding with Jaren Jackson Jr. on the Blazers' November 5 game against Memphis. Having successful right knee surgery a few days later, the injury ended his season after six games.

==== 2024–25 ====
On September 30, 2024, Williams was cleared for training camp after coming off knee surgery. On November 8, Williams made his return from injury putting up 13 points, three rebounds and two assists off the bench in a 127–102 loss against the Minnesota Timberwolves. This game marked the first time he scored a three-pointer in his NBA career.

On November 25, Williams made his first start of the season as well as his first start as a member of Portland, where he recorded six points, one assist and three rebounds in 12 minutes of action in a 123-98 loss against the Memphis Grizzlies, however during the 6:22 mark in second quarter, Williams dove hard for a loose ball and was whistled for a foul on Grizzlies guard Scotty Pippen Jr. Williams had hit his head on the floor and took extra time trying to get up, but remained in the game until the 5:51 mark of the second quarter. He re-entered the game at the 2:31 mark and played for the remainder of the first half. He did not play in the second half and was later evaluated for a concussion.

Williams made 20 total appearances (3 starts) for Portland during the 2024–25 NBA season, averaging 5.8 points, 5.9 rebounds and 1.1 assists. On March 20, 2025, Williams underwent an arthroscopy to address inflammation in his left knee, necessitating a recovery timetable of four-to-six weeks and ruling him out for the remainder of the season.

==== 2025–26 ====
Williams made 59 appearances (including one start) for the Trail Blazers during the 2025–26 NBA season, recording averages of 6.7 points, 7.0 rebounds, and 1.0 assists.

==== 2026–27 ====
On June 30, 2026, Williams re-signed with the Trail Blazers on a three-year, $44 million contract.

== Career statistics ==
Legend
GP	Games played	GS	Games started	MPG	Minutes per game
FG%	Field goal percentage	3P%	3-point field goal percentage	FT%	Free throw percentage
RPG	Rebounds per game	APG	Assists per game	SPG	Steals per game
BPG	Blocks per game	PPG	Points per game	**Bold**	Career high

=== NBA ===
==== Regular season ====
Year	Team	GP	GS	MPG	FG%	3P%	FT%	RPG	APG	SPG	BPG	PPG
2018–19	Boston	32	2	8.8	.706	—	.600	2.5	.2	.3	1.3	2.5
2019–20	Boston	29	1	13.4	.727	—	.647	4.4	.9	.8	1.2	5.2
2020–21	Boston	52	13	18.9	.721	.000	.616	6.9	1.8	.8	1.8	8.0
2021–22	Boston	**61**	**61**	**29.6**	.736	.000	.722	**9.6**	**2.0**	.9	**2.2**	**10.0**
2022–23	Boston	35	20	23.5	**.747**	.000	.610	8.3	1.4	.6	1.4	8.0
2023–24	Portland	6	0	19.8	.654	—	.778	6.3	.8	**1.2**	1.2	6.8
2024–25	Portland	20	3	17.6	.641	.333	**.882**	5.9	1.1	.7	1.7	5.8
2025–26	Portland	59	1	17.1	.708	**.391**	.597	7.0	1.0	.6	1.5	6.7
Career		294	101	19.6	.720	.333	.661	6.9	1.3	.7	1.6	7.1

==== Playoffs ====
Year	Team	GP	GS	MPG	FG%	3P%	FT%	RPG	APG	SPG	BPG	PPG
2019	Boston	3	0	4.3	.500	—	**1.000**	2.3	.0	.0	.0	1.3
2020	Boston	13	0	11.5	.742	.000	.333	3.9	.8	.2	.5	3.7
2021	Boston	3	0	15.3	.643	—	.500	5.0	.7	.3	**3.0**	6.3
2022	Boston	17	**15**	**23.2**	.679	.000	.893	6.2	1.0	**.7**	2.2	7.7
2023	Boston	**20**	4	20.9	**.788**	.000	.679	6.0	1.0	.5	1.3	7.7
2026	Portland	5	0	21.6	.629	**.333**	.333	**7.4**	**2.6**	.6	1.2	**9.6**
Career		61	19	18.2	.714	.250	.725	5.5	1.0	.5	1.4	6.6

=== College ===
Year	Team	GP	GS	MPG	FG%	3P%	FT%	RPG	APG	SPG	BPG	PPG
2016–17	Texas A&M	**31**	17	**25.8**	.558	**.111**	**.590**	8.2	**1.4**	.7	2.5	**11.9**
2017–18	Texas A&M	30	**23**	25.6	**.668**	.000	.471	**9.2**	**1.4**	**.8**	**2.6**	10.4
Career		61	40	25.7	.624	.067	.541	8.7	1.4	.7	2.5	11.1

== Personal life ==
In July 2018, Williams was revealed to have popliteal artery entrapment syndrome (PAES) in both legs. If it degenerates, the vascular disease could require a surgical procedure in the future. Williams has two children, a daughter and son.

=== Nickname ===
Early in his career, Williams has attracted the nickname "Time Lord" from Celtics fans, in part based upon his timekeeping faux pas upon signing with the team. This has, in turn, gained attention from Timex. Danny Ainge has been recorded as preferring the nickname "Lob".
