= Malik Fitts =

American basketball player (born 1997)

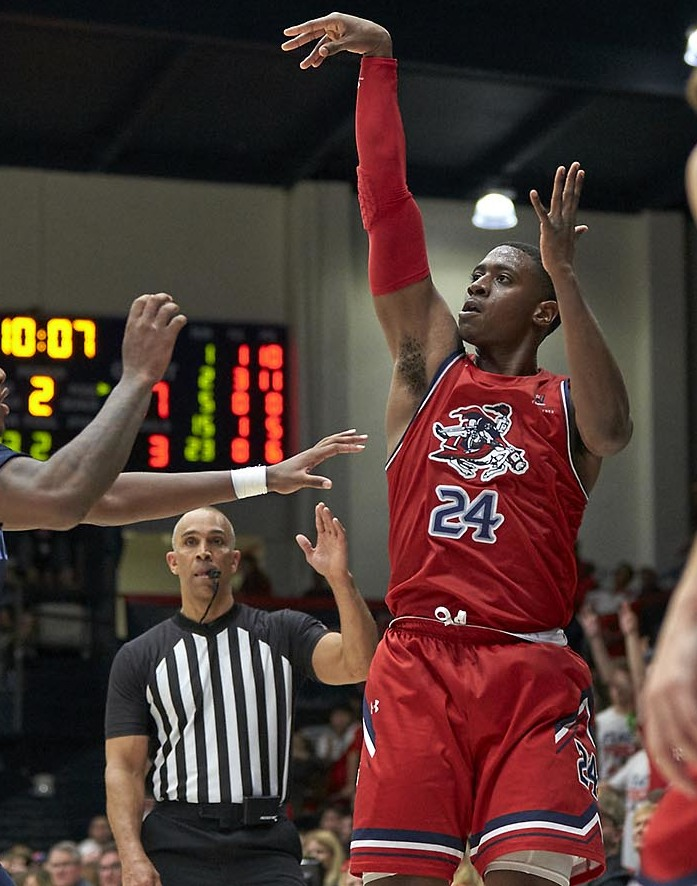
- Fitts with Saint Mary's in 2020

No. 24 – Boulazac Basket Dordogne
- Position: Power forward
- League: Betclic ÉLITE

Personal information
- Born: July 4, 1997 (age 29) Lynwood, California, U.S.
- Listed height: 6 ft 8 in (2.03 m)
- Listed weight: 230 lb (104 kg)

Career information
- High school: Damien (La Verne, California); Brewster Academy (Wolfeboro, New Hampshire)
- College: South Florida (2016–2017); Saint Mary's (2018–2020)
- NBA draft: 2020: undrafted
- Playing career: 2021–present

Career history
- 2021: Agua Caliente Clippers
- 2021: Los Angeles Clippers
- 2021–2022: Utah Jazz
- 2021–2022: →Salt Lake City Stars
- 2022: Boston Celtics
- 2022: →Maine Celtics
- 2022–2023: Ontario Clippers
- 2023: Capital City Go-Go
- 2023–2024: Cleveland Charge
- 2024–2025: SIG Strasbourg
- 2025–present: Boulazac Basket Dordogne

Career highlights
- First-team All-WCC (2020); Second-team All-WCC (2019)
- Stats at NBA.com
- Stats at Basketball Reference

Malik Jahmal Fitts (born July 4, 1997) is an American professional basketball player for Boulazac Basket Dordogne of the LNB Élite. He played college basketball for the South Florida Bulls and the Saint Mary's Gaels.

== Early life ==
Fitts grew up in Rancho Cucamonga, California and began playing basketball at the age of four, idolizing Kobe Bryant. He attended Damien High School. He helped lead the school to a CIF Division III state title as a senior and averaged 16 points and 8 rebounds per game, earning First Team All-Inland Valley honors. Fitts opted to complete a postgraduate year at Brewster Academy in Wolfeboro, New Hampshire. While at Brewster, he committed to play college basketball at South Florida over offers from DePaul, Bradley, Nevada and Hawaii.

== College career ==
Fitts began his collegiate career at South Florida. He saw significant playing time as a freshman, playing in 27 games and starting 18 while averaging 7.4 points and 4.6 rebounds per game. He was named the American Athletic Conference Rookie of the Week after a 29-point, 11-rebound performance against Memphis. Following the end of the season Fitts announced he would be leaving the program.

Fitts transferred to Saint Mary's College of California, sitting out one year per NCAA transfer rules. He became an immediate starter for the Gaels the following season, averaging 15.2 points and a team-leading 7.6 rebounds per game and was named second team All-West Coast Conference (WCC). As a redshirt junior, Fitts was a focal point on the team's offense alongside Jordan Ford. Fitts scored a career high 30 points and added eight rebounds in an 86–80 win over San Francisco on February 2, 2019. Fitts hit 5 of six three point attempts and scored 28 total points in Saint Mary's 89–77 win over California on December 14, 2019. He set a career high with 14 rebounds along with 17 points in a 66–60 win over San Diego on February 6, 2020. At the conclusion of the regular season, Fitts was named to the First Team All-WCC. As a junior, Fitts averaged 16.5 points and 7.1 rebounds per game. After the end of the season, Fitts announced that he was entering the 2020 NBA draft and signing with an agent, forgoing his final season of eligibility.

== Professional career ==
=== Agua Caliente Clippers (2021) ===
After going undrafted in the 2020 NBA draft, Fitts signed with the Los Angeles Clippers. He was waived by the team on December 14 after appearing in two preseason games. On February 4, 2021, he signed with the Agua Caliente Clippers, appearing in 14 games and averaging 11.1 points, 4.0 rebounds and 1.4 assists.

=== Los Angeles Clippers (2021) ===
On April 9, 2021, Fitts signed a 10-day contract with the Los Angeles Clippers.

=== Utah Jazz (2021–2022) ===
On September 28, 2021, Fitts signed with the Utah Jazz. His contract was converted to a two-way deal on October 16. He split time between the Jazz and their NBA G League affiliate, the Salt Lake City Stars. On January 13, 2022, Fitts was waived by the Jazz.

=== Boston Celtics (2022) ===
On February 23, 2022, Fitts signed a 10-day contract with the Boston Celtics. He signed a second 10-day contract on March 5. Fitts signed a two-year contract on March 15. The Celtics reached the 2022 NBA Finals, but were defeated by the Golden State Warriors in 6 games.

On July 9, 2022, Fitts was traded, alongside Nik Stauskas, Aaron Nesmith, Daniel Theis, Juwan Morgan and a 2023 first-round pick, to the Indiana Pacers in exchange for Malcolm Brogdon. On July 14, Fitts was waived by the Pacers.

=== Ontario Clippers (2022–2023) ===
On October 24, 2022, Fitts joined the Ontario Clippers training camp roster.

=== Capital City Go-Go (2023) ===
On October 21, 2023, Fitts signed with the Washington Wizards, but was waived the same day. On October 30, he joined the Capital City Go-Go.

=== Cleveland Charge (2023–2024) ===
On December 26, 2023, Fitts was included in a three team trade that sent him to the Cleveland Charge.

=== SIG Strasbourg (2024–2025) ===
On July 31, 2024, Fitts signed with SIG Strasbourg of the LNB Élite.

=== Boulazac Basket Dordogne (2025–present) ===
On August 21, 2025, he signed with Boulazac Basket Dordogne of the LNB Pro A.

== Career statistics ==
Legend
GP	Games played	GS	Games started	MPG	Minutes per game
FG%	Field goal percentage	3P%	3-point field goal percentage	FT%	Free throw percentage
RPG	Rebounds per game	APG	Assists per game	SPG	Steals per game
BPG	Blocks per game	PPG	Points per game	**Bold**	Career high

=== NBA ===
==== Regular season ====
Year	Team	GP	GS	MPG	FG%	3P%	FT%	RPG	APG	SPG	BPG	PPG
2020–21	L.A. Clippers	3	0	3.7	.333	**.500**	–	1.0	.0	.0	.0	1.0
2021–22	Utah	7	0	**5.0**	.222	**.500**	–	**1.4**	.0	.0	.0	.9
2021–22	Boston	**8**	0	3.5	**.600**	**.500**	–	.9	**.6**	.0	.0	**1.9**
Career		18	0	4.1	.409	.500	–	1.1	.3	.0	.0	1.3

==== Playoffs ====
Year	Team	GP	GS	MPG	FG%	3P%	FT%	RPG	APG	SPG	BPG	PPG
2022	Boston	9	0	1.8	.750	1.000	—	.2	.0	.0	.0	.9
Career		9	0	1.8	.750	1.000	—	.2	.0	.0	.0	.9

=== College ===
Year	Team	GP	GS	MPG	FG%	3P%	FT%	RPG	APG	SPG	BPG	PPG
2016–17	South Florida	27	18	24.4	.395	.338	.538	4.6	1.1	.7	**.4**	7.4
2017–18	Saint Mary's	Redshirt										
2018–19	Saint Mary's	**34**	33	30.7	**.475**	.406	.770	**7.6**	.9	1.1	.2	15.2
2019–20	Saint Mary's	**34**	**34**	**34.2**	.472	**.408**	**.799**	7.1	**1.2**	**1.4**	**.4**	**16.5**
Career		95	85	30.2	.458	.392	.745	6.5	1.1	1.1	.3	13.5

== Personal life ==
Fitts grew up in a Christian family, and his father is a pastor.
