= 2021–22 Boston Celtics season =

- Conference champions
- Division champions
- Head coach: Ime Udoka
- General manager: Brad Stevens
- Owners: Wyc Grousbeck
- Arena: TD Garden

Results
- Record: 51–31 (.622)
- Place: Division: 1st (Atlantic); Conference: 2nd (Eastern)
- Playoff finish: NBA Finals (lost to Warriors 2–4)
- Stats at Basketball Reference

Local media
- Television: NBC Sports Boston
- Radio: WBZ-FM

The 2021–22 Boston Celtics season was the 76th season of the franchise in the National Basketball Association (NBA). Following the Celtics' first-round exit to the Brooklyn Nets in five games from the previous season, Danny Ainge retired from his role as General Manager, and Brad Stevens was promoted to be the next President of Basketball Operations. The Celtics then hired Brooklyn Nets assistant Ime Udoka as the next head coach on June 28, 2021, in what was his only season as head coach before being suspended for violating team rules in September 2022. Udoka was later replaced permanently midway through the 2022–23 season by Joe Mazzulla, who had been serving as the interim head coach during Udoka's suspension.

The Celtics began the season with an 18–21 record but began a turnaround in January and finished with a 51–31 record and the #2-seed in the Eastern Conference. With the Portland Trail Blazers missing the playoffs for the first time since 2013, the Celtics now hold the longest active playoff streak, with consecutive appearances since 2015. They won the Atlantic Division for the first time since 2017. Multiple Celtics received NBA honors during the season. Jayson Tatum was selected to the All-NBA First Team and was named Eastern Conference Finals MVP, while Marcus Smart was named NBA Defensive Player of the Year and Robert Williams III joined him on the NBA All-Defensive Team.

In the first round of the playoffs, the Celtics swept the Brooklyn Nets in four games, which was their third series sweep in four seasons. In the second round, they faced the defending champion Milwaukee Bucks for the third time in five seasons and defeated them in seven games. In the final game of the series, the Celtics made 22 3-pointers, a record for the most ever in a Game 7. The Celtics then advanced to the Eastern Conference Finals for the fourth time in six years to face the top-seeded Miami Heat. In the previous two Conference finals matchups between the two teams, the Celtics lost both times: in 2012 in seven games and in 2020 in six. This time, they beat the Heat in seven games—including three wins on the road—to advance to the 2022 NBA Finals, their first Finals appearance since 2010. The Celtics faced the Golden State Warriors in a rematch of the 1964 Finals in an attempt to win their 18th championship and first since 2008, but lost in six games despite taking a 2–1 lead.

== Draft picks ==
Round	Pick	Player	Position	Nationality	College/Club
2	45	Juhann Begarin	SG	France	Paris Basketball

The Celtics entered the draft with one second-round pick. They had traded their first-round pick to the Oklahoma City Thunder alongside Kemba Walker in June 2021.

== Roster ==
2021–22 Boston Celtics roster
Players

Pos.	No.	Player	Height	Weight	DOB	From
G/F	7	Jaylen Brown	6 ft 7 in (2.01 m)	223 lb (101 kg)	1996-10-24	California
F	8	Malik Fitts	6 ft 6 in (1.98 m)	230 lb (104 kg)	1997-07-04	Saint Mary's
F	30	Sam Hauser	6 ft 7 in (2.01 m)	217 lb (98 kg)	1997-12-08	Virginia
F/C	42	Al Horford (C)	6 ft 9 in (2.06 m)	240 lb (109 kg)	1986-06-03	Florida
C	40	Luke Kornet	7 ft 2 in (2.18 m)	250 lb (113 kg)	1995-07-15	Vanderbilt
F	4	Juwan Morgan	6 ft 7 in (2.01 m)	232 lb (105 kg)	1997-04-17	Indiana
G	26	Aaron Nesmith	6 ft 5 in (1.96 m)	215 lb (98 kg)	1999-10-16	Vanderbilt
G	11	Payton Pritchard	6 ft 1 in (1.85 m)	195 lb (88 kg)	1998-01-28	Oregon
F	37	Matt Ryan (TW)	6 ft 7 in (2.01 m)	215 lb (98 kg)	1997-04-17	Chattanooga
G	36	Marcus Smart (C)	6 ft 4 in (1.93 m)	220 lb (100 kg)	1994-03-06	Oklahoma State
G	13	Nik Stauskas	6 ft 6 in (1.98 m)	207 lb (94 kg)	1993-10-07	Michigan
G/F	0	Jayson Tatum	6 ft 8 in (2.03 m)	210 lb (95 kg)	1998-03-03	Duke
C	27	Daniel Theis	6 ft 9 in (2.06 m)	245 lb (111 kg)	1992-04-04	Germany
G	97	Brodric Thomas (TW)	6 ft 5 in (1.96 m)	185 lb (84 kg)	1997-01-28	Truman State
G	9	Derrick White	6 ft 4 in (1.93 m)	190 lb (86 kg)	1994-07-02	Colorado
F	12	Grant Williams	6 ft 6 in (1.98 m)	236 lb (107 kg)	1998-11-30	Tennessee
C	44	Robert III Williams	6 ft 9 in (2.06 m)	237 lb (108 kg)	1997-10-17	Texas A&M

Coaches
Head coach
- Ime Udoka
Assistant(s)
- Tony Dobbins
- Will Hardy
- Joe Mazzulla
- Aaron Miles
- Damon Stoudamire
- Ben Sullivan

Legend
- (DP) Unsigned draft pick
- (FA) Free agent
- (S) Suspended
- (GL) On assignment to G League affiliate
- (TW) Two-way affiliate player
- Injured

Roster
Updated: April 9, 2022

== Standings ==
=== Division ===
Atlantic Division	W	L	PCT	GB	Home	Road	Div	GP
y – Boston Celtics	51	31	.622	–	28‍–‍13	23‍–‍18	9–7	82
x – Philadelphia 76ers	51	31	.622	–	24‍–‍17	27‍–‍14	6–10	82
x – Toronto Raptors	48	34	.585	3.0	24‍–‍17	24‍–‍17	10–6	82
x − Brooklyn Nets	44	38	.537	7.0	20‍–‍21	24‍–‍17	10–6	82
New York Knicks	37	45	.451	14.0	17‍–‍24	20‍–‍21	5–11	82

=== Conference ===
Eastern Conference
#	Team	W	L	PCT	GB	GP
1	c – Miami Heat *	53	29	.646	–	82
2	y – Boston Celtics *	51	31	.622	2.0	82
3	y – Milwaukee Bucks *	51	31	.622	2.0	82
4	x – Philadelphia 76ers	51	31	.622	2.0	82
5	x – Toronto Raptors	48	34	.585	5.0	82
6	x – Chicago Bulls	46	36	.561	7.0	82
7	x − Brooklyn Nets	44	38	.537	9.0	82
8	pi − Cleveland Cavaliers	44	38	.537	9.0	82
9	x − Atlanta Hawks	43	39	.524	10.0	82
10	pi − Charlotte Hornets	43	39	.524	10.0	82
11	New York Knicks	37	45	.451	16.0	82
12	Washington Wizards	35	47	.427	18.0	82
13	Indiana Pacers	25	57	.305	28.0	82
14	Detroit Pistons	23	59	.280	30.0	82
15	Orlando Magic	22	60	.268	31.0	82

== Game log ==
=== Preseason ===
2021 preseason game log
Total: 2–2 (home: 2–0; road: 0–2)
Preseason: 2–2 (home: 2–0; road: 0–2)

Game	Date	Team	Score	High points	High rebounds	High assists	Location Attendance	Record
1	October 4	Orlando	W 98–97	Jaylen Brown (25)	Jayson Tatum (9)	Payton Pritchard (5)	TD Garden; 19,156	1–0
2	October 9	Toronto	W 113–111	Jayson Tatum (20)	Enes Kanter (10)	Smart, Tatum (9)	TD Garden; 19,156	2–0
3	October 13	@ Orlando	L 102–103	Aaron Nesmith (23)	Robert Williams III (7)	Nesmith, G. Williams (4)	Amway Center; 13,519	2–1
4	October 15	@ Miami	L 100–121	Jayson Tatum (23)	Jayson Tatum (8)	Dennis Schröder (6)	FTX Arena; 19,600	2–2

2021–22 season schedule

=== Regular season ===
2021–22 game log
Total: 51–31 (home: 28–13; road: 23–18)
October: 2–4 (home: 0–2; road: 2–2)

Game	Date	Team	Score	High points	High rebounds	High assists	Location Attendance	Record
1	October 20	@ New York	L 134–138 (2OT)	Jaylen Brown (46)	Jayson Tatum (11)	Brown, Smart (6)	Madison Square Garden; 19,812	0–1
2	October 22	Toronto	L 83–115	Jayson Tatum (18)	Al Horford (11)	Marcus Smart (5)	TD Garden; 19,156	0–2
3	October 24	@ Houston	W 107–97	Jayson Tatum (31)	Al Horford (10)	Schröder, Smart (5)	Toyota Center; 16,069	1–2
4	October 25	@ Charlotte	W 140–129 (OT)	Jayson Tatum (41)	Robert Williams III (16)	Schröder, Tatum (8)	Spectrum Center; 17,238	2–2
5	October 27	Washington	L 107–116	Jayson Tatum (23)	Horford, Williams (11)	Dennis Schroder (6)	TD Garden; 19,156	2–3
6	October 30	@ Washington	L 112–115 (2OT)	Jaylen Brown (34)	Jayson Tatum (15)	Dennis Schröder (9)	Capital One Arena; 15,813	2–4

November: 9–6 (home: 5–2; road: 4–4)

Game	Date	Team	Score	High points	High rebounds	High assists	Location Attendance	Record
7	November 1	Chicago	L 114–128	Jaylen Brown (28)	Al Horford (10)	Dennis Schröder (5)	TD Garden; 19,156	2–5
8	November 3	@ Orlando	W 92–79	Jaylen Brown (28)	Al Horford (12)	Al Horford (7)	Amway Center; 12,735	3–5
9	November 4	@ Miami	W 95–78	Jaylen Brown (17)	Robert Williams III (10)	Dennis Schröder (6)	FTX Arena; 19,600	4–5
10	November 6	@ Dallas	L 104–107	Jayson Tatum (32)	Jayson Tatum (11)	Smart, Schröder (6)	American Airlines Center; 20,052	4–6
11	November 10	Toronto	W 104–88	Jayson Tatum (22)	Robert Williams III (13)	Jayson Tatum (7)	TD Garden; 19,156	5–6
12	November 12	Milwaukee	W 122–113	Dennis Schröder (38)	Robert Williams III (10)	Marcus Smart (6)	TD Garden; 19,156	6–6
13	November 13	@ Cleveland	L 89–91	Dennis Schröder (28)	Robert Williams III (16)	Marcus Smart (8)	Rocket Mortgage FieldHouse; 19,432	6–7
14	November 15	@ Cleveland	W 98–92	Jayson Tatum (23)	Al Horford (9)	Smart, Tatum (5)	Rocket Mortgage FieldHouse; 17,186	7–7
15	November 17	@ Atlanta	L 99–110	Jayson Tatum (34)	Jayson Tatum (9)	Marcus Smart (11)	State Farm Arena; 16,445	7–8
16	November 19	L.A. Lakers	W 130–108	Jayson Tatum (37)	Jayson Tatum (11)	Schröder, Smart (6)	TD Garden; 19,156	8–8
17	November 20	Oklahoma City	W 111–105	Jayson Tatum (33)	Al Horford (11)	Marcus Smart (8)	TD Garden; 19,156	9–8
18	November 22	Houston	W 108–90	Jayson Tatum (30)	Robert Williams III (15)	Marcus Smart (5)	TD Garden; 19,156	10–8
19	November 24	Brooklyn	L 104–123	Marcus Smart (20)	Jayson Tatum (8)	Marcus Smart (8)	TD Garden; 19,156	10–9
20	November 26	@ San Antonio	L 88–96	Jayson Tatum (24)	Jayson Tatum (12)	Marcus Smart (8)	AT&T Center; 15,360	10–10
21	November 28	@ Toronto	W 109–97	Marcus Smart (21)	Al Horford (11)	Jayson Tatum (10)	Scotiabank Arena; 19,800	11–10

December: 6–9 (home: 5–3; road: 1–6)

Game	Date	Team	Score	High points	High rebounds	High assists	Location Attendance	Record
22	December 1	Philadelphia	W 88–87	Jayson Tatum (26)	Jayson Tatum (16)	Marcus Smart (8)	TD Garden; 19,156	12–10
23	December 3	@ Utah	L 130–137	Jayson Tatum (37)	Horford, Tatum (6)	Al Horford (9)	Vivint Arena; 18,306	12–11
24	December 4	@ Portland	W 145–117	Schröder, Tatum (31)	Enes Freedom (15)	Dennis Schröder (8)	Moda Center; 18,193	13–11
25	December 7	@ L.A. Lakers	L 102–117	Jayson Tatum (34)	Horford, Tatum (8)	Marcus Smart (6)	Staples Center; 18,997	13–12
26	December 8	@ L.A. Clippers	L 111–114	Jayson Tatum (29)	Jayson Tatum (10)	Dennis Schröder (8)	Staples Center; 17,064	13–13
27	December 10	@ Phoenix	L 90–111	Jayson Tatum (24)	Langford, Tatum (7)	Horford, Pritchard, Schröder, Tatum (4)	Footprint Center; 17,071	13–14
28	December 13	Milwaukee	W 117–103	Jayson Tatum (42)	G. Williams, R. Williams III (7)	Marcus Smart (11)	TD Garden; 19,156	14–14
29	December 17	Golden State	L 107–111	Jayson Tatum (27)	Robert Williams III (11)	Marcus Smart (8)	TD Garden; 19,156	14–15
30	December 18	New York	W 114–107	Josh Richardson (27)	Jayson Tatum (9)	Brown, Smart (5)	TD Garden; 19,156	15–15
31	December 20	Philadelphia	L 103–108	Jaylen Brown (30)	Enes Freedom (11)	Jayson Tatum (6)	TD Garden; 19,156	15–16
32	December 22	Cleveland	W 111–101	Jaylen Brown (34)	Robert Williams III (11)	Robert Williams III (7)	TD Garden; 19,156	16–16
33	December 25	@ Milwaukee	L 113–117	Brown, Tatum (25)	Robert Williams III (14)	Marcus Smart (7)	Fiserv Forum; 17,341	16–17
34	December 27	@ Minnesota	L 103–108	Jaylen Brown (26)	Robert Williams III (11)	Horford, Pritchard (6)	Target Center; 15,962	16–18
35	December 29	L.A. Clippers	L 81–92	Jaylen Brown (30)	Robert Williams III (14)	Al Horford (8)	TD Garden; 19,156	16–19
36	December 31	Phoenix	W 123–108	Brown, Smart (24)	Brown, Williams III (11)	Robert Williams III (10)	TD Garden; 19,156	17–19

January: 10–6 (home: 7–3; road: 3–3)

Game	Date	Team	Score	High points	High rebounds	High assists	Location Attendance	Record
37	January 2	Orlando	W 116–111 (OT)	Jaylen Brown (50)	Jaylen Brown (11)	Schröder, Smart (7)	TD Garden; 19,156	18–19
38	January 5	San Antonio	L 97–99	Jaylen Brown (30)	Robert Williams III (9)	Marcus Smart (6)	TD Garden; 19,156	18–20
39	January 6	@ New York	L 105–108	Jayson Tatum (36)	Robert Williams III (9)	Jayson Tatum (9)	Madison Square Garden; 17,529	18–21
40	January 8	New York	W 99–75	Jaylen Brown (22)	Jaylen Brown (11)	Jaylen Brown (11)	TD Garden; 19,156	19–21
41	January 10	Indiana	W 101–98 (OT)	Jaylen Brown (26)	Jaylen Brown (15)	Jaylen Brown (6)	TD Garden; 19,156	20–21
42	January 12	@ Indiana	W 119–100	Jaylen Brown (34)	Robert Williams III (9)	three players 4	Gainbridge Fieldhouse; 13,560	21–21
43	January 14	@ Philadelphia	L 99–111	Jaylen Brown (21)	Robert Williams III (14)	Jayson Tatum (5)	Wells Fargo Center; 20,444	21–22
44	January 15	Chicago	W 114–112	Jayson Tatum (23)	Robert Williams III (13)	Dennis Schröder (8)	TD Garden; 19,156	22–22
45	January 17	New Orleans	W 104–92	Jayson Tatum (27)	Brown, Tatum (8)	Dennis Schröder (9)	TD Garden; 19,156	23–22
46	January 19	Charlotte	L 102–111	Dennis Schröder (24)	Al Horford (10)	Jaylen Brown (6)	TD Garden; 19,156	23–23
47	January 21	Portland	L 105–109	Jayson Tatum (27)	Tatum, Williams III (10)	Jayson Tatum (7)	TD Garden; 19,156	23–24
48	January 23	@ Washington	W 116–87	Jayson Tatum (51)	Brown, Tatum (10)	Jayson Tatum (7)	Capital One Arena; 16,371	24–24
49	January 25	Sacramento	W 128–75	Jayson Tatum (36)	Robert Williams III (17)	Marcus Smart (7)	TD Garden; 19,156	25–24
50	January 28	@ Atlanta	L 92–108	Jaylen Brown (26)	Jaylen Brown (12)	Jayson Tatum (4)	State Farm Arena; 16,932	25–25
51	January 29	@ New Orleans	W 107–97	Jayson Tatum (38)	Robert Williams III (16)	Marcus Smart (12)	Smoothie King Center; 16,168	26–25
52	January 31	Miami	W 122–92	Jaylen Brown (29)	Jayson Tatum (12)	Marcus Smart (7)	TD Garden; 19,156	27–25

February: 9–2 (home: 3–1; road: 6–1)

Game	Date	Team	Score	High points	High rebounds	High assists	Location Attendance	Record
53	February 2	Charlotte	W 113–107	Josh Richardson (23)	Al Horford (12)	Jayson Tatum (9)	TD Garden; 19,156	28–25
54	February 4	@ Detroit	W 102–93	Jayson Tatum (24)	Robert Williams III (11)	Marcus Smart (6)	Little Caesars Arena; 17,584	29–25
55	February 6	@ Orlando	W 116–83	Jaylen Brown (26)	Al Horford (11)	Jayson Tatum (7)	Amway Center; 14,402	30–25
56	February 8	@ Brooklyn	W 126–91	Brown, Smart (22)	Enes Freedom (12)	Jaylen Brown (9)	Barclays Center; 17,732	31–25
57	February 11	Denver	W 108–102	Jayson Tatum (24)	Robert Williams III (16)	Marcus Smart (7)	TD Garden; 19,156	32–25
58	February 13	Atlanta	W 105–95	Jayson Tatum (38)	Robert Williams III (14)	Marcus Smart (7)	TD Garden; 19,156	33–25
59	February 15	@ Philadelphia	W 135–87	Jaylen Brown (29)	Jayson Tatum (12)	Payton Pritchard (7)	Wells Fargo Center; 20,960	34–25
60	February 16	Detroit	L 111–112	Jaylen Brown (31)	Al Horford (7)	Al Horford (7)	TD Garden; 19,156	34–26
All-Star Break
61	February 24	@ Brooklyn	W 129–106	Jayson Tatum (30)	Al Horford (13)	Jaylen Brown (6)	Barclays Center; 17,986	35–26
62	February 26	@ Detroit	W 113–104	Jaylen Brown (27)	Jayson Tatum (11)	Marcus Smart (7)	Little Caesars Arena; 19,122	36–26
63	February 27	@ Indiana	L 107–128	Jayson Tatum (24)	Robert Williams III (11)	Jaylen Brown (8)	Gainbridge Fieldhouse; 16,872	36–27

March: 11–3 (home: 6–2; road: 5–1)

Game	Date	Team	Score	High points	High rebounds	High assists	Location Attendance	Record
64	March 1	Atlanta	W 107–98	Jayson Tatum (33)	Robert Williams III (13)	Jayson Tatum (7)	TD Garden; 19,156	37–27
65	March 3	Memphis	W 120–107	Jayson Tatum (37)	Al Horford (15)	Marcus Smart (12)	TD Garden; 19,156	38–27
66	March 6	Brooklyn	W 126–120	Jayson Tatum (54)	Robert Williams III (8)	Marcus Smart (9)	TD Garden; 19,156	39–27
67	March 9	@ Charlotte	W 115–101	Jayson Tatum (44)	Robert Williams III (11)	Marcus Smart (9)	Spectrum Center; 18,086	40–27
68	March 11	Detroit	W 114–103	Jayson Tatum (31)	Robert Williams III (9)	Jayson Tatum (6)	TD Garden; 19,156	41–27
69	March 13	Dallas	L 92–95	Jayson Tatum (21)	Jayson Tatum (11)	Brown, Smart, Tatum (4)	TD Garden; 19,156	41–28
70	March 16	@ Golden State	W 110–88	Jayson Tatum (26)	Jayson Tatum (12)	Marcus Smart (8)	Chase Center; 18,064	42–28
71	March 18	@ Sacramento	W 126–97	Jayson Tatum (32)	Al Horford (9)	Payton Pritchard (8)	Golden 1 Center; 15,313	43–28
72	March 20	@ Denver	W 124–104	Jayson Tatum (30)	Robert Williams III (9)	Jayson Tatum (7)	Ball Arena; 19,602	44–28
73	March 21	@ Oklahoma City	W 132–123	Jayson Tatum (36)	Grant Williams (10)	Al Horford (7)	Paycom Center; 15,345	45–28
74	March 23	Utah	W 125–97	Jaylen Brown (26)	Robert Williams III (10)	Marcus Smart (13)	TD Garden; 19,156	46–28
75	March 27	Minnesota	W 134–112	Jayson Tatum (34)	Jaylen Brown (10)	Marcus Smart (7)	TD Garden; 19,156	47–28
76	March 28	@ Toronto	L 112–115 (OT)	Marcus Smart (28)	Marcus Smart (10)	Derrick White (8)	Scotiabank Arena; 19,800	47–29
77	March 30	Miami	L 98–106	Jaylen Brown (28)	Al Horford (15)	Marcus Smart (8)	TD Garden; 19,156	47–30

April: 4–1 (home: 2–0; road: 2–1)

Game	Date	Team	Score	High points	High rebounds	High assists	Location Attendance	Record
78	April 1	Indiana	W 128–123	Jaylen Brown (32)	Al Horford (10)	Jaylen Brown (7)	TD Garden; 19,156	48–30
79	April 3	Washington	W 144–102	Jaylen Brown (32)	Al Horford (8)	Smart, Tatum (7)	TD Garden; 19,156	49–30
80	April 6	@ Chicago	W 117–94	Jaylen Brown (25)	Al Horford (10)	Jayson Tatum (8)	United Center; 21,095	50–30
81	April 7	@ Milwaukee	L 121–127	Marcus Smart (29)	Jaylen Brown (10)	Jaylen Brown (11)	Fiserv Forum; 18,046	50–31
82	April 10	@ Memphis	W 139–110	Jayson Tatum (31)	Daniel Theis (10)	Marcus Smart (6)	FedExForum; 17,441	51–31

2021–22 season schedule

=== Playoffs ===
2022 playoff game log
Total: 14–10 (home: 6–6; road: 8–4)
First Round: 4–0 (home: 2–0; road: 2–0)

Game	Date	Team	Score	High points	High rebounds	High assists	Location Attendance	Series
1	April 17	Brooklyn	W 115–114	Jayson Tatum (31)	Al Horford (15)	Jayson Tatum (8)	TD Garden; 19,156	1–0
2	April 20	Brooklyn	W 114–107	Jaylen Brown (22)	Tatum, Horford, Theis, Williams (6)	Jayson Tatum (10)	TD Garden; 19,156	2–0
3	April 23	@ Brooklyn	W 109–103	Jayson Tatum (39)	White, Theis (6)	Tatum, Smart (6)	Barclays Center; 18,175	3–0
4	April 25	@ Brooklyn	W 116–112	Jayson Tatum (29)	Jaylen Brown (8)	Marcus Smart (11)	Barclays Center; 18,099	4–0

Conference Semifinals: 4–3 (home: 2–2; road: 2–1)

Game	Date	Team	Score	High points	High rebounds	High assists	Location Attendance	Series
1	May 1	Milwaukee	L 89–101	Jayson Tatum (21)	Al Horford (10)	Smart, Tatum (6)	TD Garden; 19,156	0–1
2	May 3	Milwaukee	W 109–86	Jaylen Brown (30)	Al Horford (11)	Jayson Tatum (8)	TD Garden; 19,156	1–1
3	May 7	@ Milwaukee	L 101–103	Jaylen Brown (27)	Al Horford (16)	Al Horford (5)	Fiserv Forum; 17,736	1–2
4	May 9	@ Milwaukee	W 116–108	Horford, Tatum (30)	Jayson Tatum (13)	Marcus Smart (8)	Fiserv Forum; 17,505	2–2
5	May 11	Milwaukee	L 107–110	Jayson Tatum (34)	Brown, Horford (8)	Brown, Horford, White (6)	TD Garden; 19,156	2–3
6	May 13	@ Milwaukee	W 108–95	Jayson Tatum (46)	Al Horford (10)	Marcus Smart (7)	Fiserv Forum; 17,681	3–3
7	May 15	Milwaukee	W 109–81	Grant Williams (27)	Al Horford (10)	Marcus Smart (10)	TD Garden; 19,156	4–3

Conference Finals: 4–3 (home: 1–2; road: 3–1)

Game	Date	Team	Score	High points	High rebounds	High assists	Location Attendance	Series
1	May 17	@ Miami	L 107–118	Jayson Tatum (29)	Jaylen Brown (10)	Jayson Tatum (6)	FTX Arena; 19,774	0–1
2	May 19	@ Miami	W 127–102	Jayson Tatum (27)	Marcus Smart (9)	Marcus Smart (12)	FTX Arena; 20,100	1–1
3	May 21	Miami	L 103–109	Jaylen Brown (40)	Al Horford (14)	Marcus Smart (7)	TD Garden; 19,156	1–2
4	May 23	Miami	W 102–82	Jayson Tatum (31)	Al Horford (13)	Derrick White (6)	TD Garden; 19,156	2–2
5	May 25	@ Miami	W 93–80	Jaylen Brown (25)	Jayson Tatum (12)	Jayson Tatum (9)	FTX Arena; 19,819	3–2
6	May 27	Miami	L 103–111	Jayson Tatum (30)	Horford Tatum (9)	Brown, Horford, White (5)	TD Garden; 19,156	3–3
7	May 29	@ Miami	W 100–96	Jayson Tatum (26)	Al Horford (13)	Brown Tatum (6)	FTX Arena; 20,200	4–3

NBA Finals: 2–4 (home: 1–2; road: 1–2)

Game	Date	Team	Score	High points	High rebounds	High assists	Location Attendance	Series
1	June 2	@ Golden State	W 120–108	Al Horford (26)	Jaylen Brown (7)	Jayson Tatum (13)	Chase Center; 18,064	1–0
2	June 5	@ Golden State	L 88–107	Jayson Tatum (28)	Al Horford (8)	Marcus Smart (5)	Chase Center; 18,064	1–1
3	June 8	Golden State	W 116–100	Jaylen Brown (27)	Robert Williams III (10)	Jayson Tatum (9)	TD Garden; 19,156	2–1
4	June 10	Golden State	L 97–107	Jayson Tatum (23)	Robert Williams III (12)	Jayson Tatum (6)	TD Garden; 19,156	2–2
5	June 13	@ Golden State	L 94–104	Jayson Tatum (27)	Jayson Tatum (10)	Tatum, Brown (4)	Chase Center; 18,064	2–3
6	June 16	Golden State	L 90–103	Jaylen Brown (34)	Al Horford (14)	Marcus Smart (9)	TD Garden; 19,156	2–4

2021–22 season schedule

== Player statistics ==
Legend
GP	Games played	GS	Games started	MPG	Minutes per game
FG%	Field-goal percentage	3P%	3-point field-goal percentage	FT%	Free-throw percentage
RPG	Rebounds per game	APG	Assists per game	SPG	Steals per game
BPG	Blocks per game	PPG	Points per game

=== Regular season ===
Boston Celtics statistics
Player	GP	GS	MPG	FG%	3P%	FT%	RPG	APG	SPG	BPG	PPG
Grant Williams	77	21	24.4	.475	.411	.905	3.6	1.0	.5	.7	7.8
Jayson Tatum	76	76	35.9	.453	.353	.853	9.0	4.4	1.0	.6	26.9
Marcus Smart	71	71	32.3	.418	.331	.793	3.8	5.9	1.7	.3	12.1
Payton Pritchard	71	2	14.1	.429	.412	1.000	1.9	2.0	.4	.1	6.2
Al Horford	69	69	29.1	.467	.336	.842	7.7	3.4	.7	1.3	10.2
Jaylen Brown	66	66	33.6	.473	.358	.758	6.1	3.5	1.1	.3	23.6
Robert Williams III	61	61	29.6	.736	.000	.722	9.6	2.0	.9	2.2	10.0
Aaron Nesmith	52	3	11.0	.396	.270	.808	1.7	.4	.4	.1	3.8
Dennis Schröder^{†}	49	25	29.2	.440	.349	.848	3.3	4.2	.8	.1	14.4
Romeo Langford^{†}	44	5	16.5	.429	.349	.588	2.4	.4	.5	.4	4.7
Josh Richardson^{†}	44	0	24.7	.443	.397	.859	2.8	1.5	.8	.5	9.7
Enes Kanter Freedom	35	1	11.7	.526	.400	.857	4.6	.2	.1	.4	3.7
Derrick White^{†}	26	4	27.4	.409	.306	.853	3.4	3.5	.6	.6	11.0
Sam Hauser	26	0	6.1	.460	.432		1.1	.4	.0	.1	2.5
Daniel Theis^{†}	21	6	18.7	.598	.357	.688	4.7	1.0	.4	.7	7.9
Bruno Fernando^{†}	20	0	2.9	.500	1.000	.800	.8	.2	.0	.2	1.0
Juancho Hernangómez^{†}	18	0	5.3	.185	.167	.667	1.4	.2	.2	.1	1.1
Jabari Parker	12	0	9.3	.474	.500	1.000	2.3	.5	.3	.1	4.4
Luke Kornet^{†}	12	0	7.1	.571	.000	.667	2.1	.7	.3	.2	2.2
Brodric Thomas	12	0	5.0	.444	.222	.600	.8	.9	.1	.1	1.8
Malik Fitts^{†}	8	0	3.5	.600	.500		.9	.6	.0	.0	1.9
Nik Stauskas^{†}	6	0	2.5	.333	.333	.500	.0	.2	.0	.0	1.2
Kelan Martin^{†}	3	0	2.0	.000	.000		.7	.0	.0	.0	.0
Matt Ryan	1	0	5.0	.200	.200		.0	.0	1.0	.0	3.0
Juwan Morgan^{†}	1	0	4.0				.0	.0	.0	.0	.0
Justin Jackson^{†}	1	0	2.0	.000		1.000	.0	.0	.0	.0	2.0
Joe Johnson	1	0	2.0	1.000			.0	.0	.0	.0	2.0
C. J. Miles	1	0	2.0				.0	.0	.0	.0	.0

=== Playoffs ===
Boston Celtics statistics
Player	GP	GS	MPG	FG%	3P%	FT%	RPG	APG	SPG	BPG	PPG
Jayson Tatum	24	24	41.0	.426	.393	.800	6.7	6.2	1.2	.9	25.6
Jaylen Brown	24	24	38.3	.470	.373	.763	6.9	3.5	1.1	.4	23.1
Grant Williams	24	5	27.3	.433	.393	.808	3.8	.8	.3	.8	8.6
Payton Pritchard	24	0	12.9	.422	.333	.667	1.9	1.6	.3	.1	4.8
Al Horford	23	23	35.4	.523	.480	.778	9.3	3.3	.8	1.3	12.0
Derrick White	23	3	25.4	.364	.313	.824	3.0	2.7	.9	.6	8.5
Marcus Smart	21	21	36.2	.405	.350	.806	4.5	5.9	1.2	.2	15.4
Robert Williams III	17	15	23.2	.679	.000	.893	6.2	1.0	.7	2.2	7.7
Daniel Theis	16	5	12.5	.588	.214	.750	3.3	.7	.3	.5	4.3
Aaron Nesmith	15	0	3.5	.235	.091	.750	1.0	.2	.1	.3	.8
Nik Stauskas	13	0	1.8	.250	.300	1.000	.3	.3	.0	.0	1.0
Luke Kornet	9	0	2.1	.750	1.000		.6	.1	.0	.0	.8
Malik Fitts	9	0	1.8	.750	1.000		.2	.0	.0	.0	.9
Juwan Morgan	9	0	1.7	.000	.000	.500	.3	.0	.0	.0	.1
Sam Hauser	7	0	2.1	.250	.333	1.000	.1	.3	.0	.0	.7

- ^{†} Denotes player spent time with another team in the season. Stats reflect time with the Celtics only.

== Transactions ==
=== Trades ===
June 18, 2021	To Boston Celtics Moses Brown; Al Horford; 2023 OKC second-round pick	To Oklahoma City Thunder Kemba Walker; 2021 BOS first-round pick 2025 BOS second-round pick
July 31, 2021	To Boston Celtics Josh Richardson	To Dallas Mavericks Moses Brown
August 7, 2021	To Boston Celtics Kris Dunn (from Atlanta); Bruno Fernando (from Atlanta); 2023 POR second-round pick (from Atlanta)	To Sacramento Kings Tristan Thompson (from Boston)
August 7, 2021	To Atlanta Hawks Delon Wright (from Sacramento)
August 17, 2021	To Boston Celtics Cash considerations	To New York Knicks Evan Fournier (sign and trade); 2022 CHA second-round pick 2023 BOS second-round pick
September 15, 2021	To Boston Celtics Juancho Hernangómez	To Memphis Grizzlies Kris Dunn; Carsen Edwards; 2026 right to swap second-round picks
January 19, 2022	To Boston Celtics Bol Bol (from Denver); PJ Dozier (from Denver)	To San Antonio Spurs Juancho Hernangómez (from Boston); 2028 DEN second-round pick (from Denver); Cash considerations (from Boston); Cash considerations (from Denver)
January 19, 2022	To Denver Nuggets Bryn Forbes (from San Antonio)
February 10, 2022	To Boston Celtics Future second-round pick	To Orlando Magic Bol Bol; PJ Dozier; Future second-round pick Cash considerations
February 10, 2022	To Boston Celtics Derrick White	To San Antonio Spurs Romeo Langford; Josh Richardson; 2022 BOS first-round pick 2028 right to swap first-round picks
February 10, 2022	To Boston Celtics Daniel Theis	To Houston Rockets Bruno Fernando; Enes Freedom; Dennis Schröder

== Free agency ==
=== Additions ===
Player	Signed	Former Team
Sam Hauser	August 13	Virginia
Enes Freedom	August 13	Portland Trail Blazers
Dennis Schröder	August 13	Los Angeles Lakers
Brodric Thomas	October 18	Cleveland Cavaliers

=== Subtractions ===
Player	Reason	New Team
Semi Ojeleye	Free agency	Milwaukee Bucks
Tacko Fall	Free agency	Cleveland Cavaliers
Tremont Waters	Free agency	Milwaukee Bucks
