= Juwan Morgan =

American basketball player (born 1997)

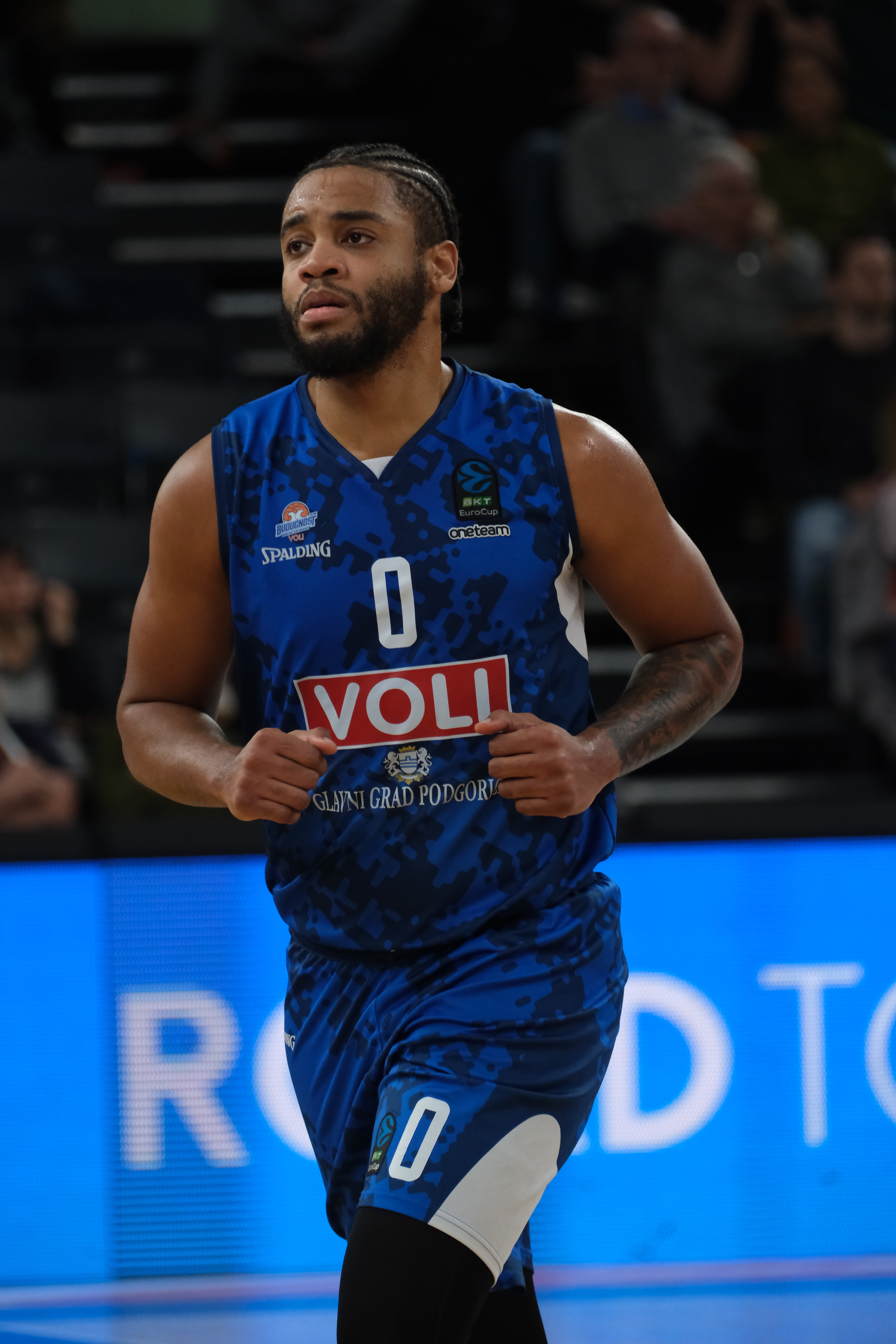
- Morgan with Budućnost in 2025

No. 15 – Budućnost
- Position: Power forward
- League: ABA League

Personal information
- Born: April 17, 1997 (age 29) Landstuhl, Germany
- Listed height: 6 ft 7 in (2.01 m)
- Listed weight: 232 lb (105 kg)

Career information
- High school: Waynesville (Waynesville, Missouri)
- College: Indiana (2015–2019)
- NBA draft: 2019: undrafted
- Playing career: 2019–present

Career history
- 2019: Salt Lake City Stars
- 2019–2021: Utah Jazz
- 2019–2020: →Salt Lake City Stars
- 2021: Maine Celtics
- 2021–2022: Toronto Raptors
- 2022: Maine Celtics
- 2022: Boston Celtics
- 2022–2023: Ontario Clippers
- 2023–2024: Runa Basket Moscow
- 2024: Zenit Saint Petersburg
- 2024–present: Budućnost

Career highlights
- Montenegrin Cup winner (2025); Second-team All-Big Ten (2018); Third-team All-Big Ten (2019)
- Stats at NBA.com
- Stats at Basketball Reference

Juwan Christopher Morgan (born April 17, 1997) is an American professional basketball player for Budućnost of the ABA League. He played college basketball for the Indiana Hoosiers.

== Early life & high school ==
Morgan is the son of Darren and Lynn Morgan, both who had served in the United States Army. He grew up playing football as a wide receiver and quarterback. By the time he was 13, Morgan was 6 ft 3 in (1.91 m) and began to focus more on basketball. He joined AAU squad MOKAN Basketball, based in Kansas City, Missouri. Morgan became a star player at Waynesville High School. As a junior, Morgan earned Springfield News-Leader's postseason team and the American Family All-USA Ozarks honors. He was a Rivals.com four-star recruit and was the 16th ranked power forward in his class.

== College career ==
On September 10, 2014, Morgan verbally committed to play college basketball at Indiana University, choosing the Hoosiers over the likes of Vanderbilt University and Creighton University, among others.

Morgan averaged 2.4 points and 2.1 rebounds per game as a freshman. He improved his averages to 7.7 points and 5.6 rebounds per game as a sophomore. Morgan was forced to play many minutes at the center position as a junior due to a season-ending injury to De’Ron Davis. Morgan scored a then career-high 28 points on November 22, 2017, in an 87–70 win over Arkansas State. On December 16, Morgan recorded 34 points and 11 rebounds in an 80–77 overtime win over Notre Dame in the Crossroads Classic. He was named NBCSports.com National Player of the Week as well as Big Ten Conference Player of the Week. Morgan was named second-team All-Big Ten by the coaches and media. He averaged 16.5 points and 7.4 rebounds per game as a junior. After the season Morgan declared for the 2018 NBA draft but did not hire an agent and ultimately opted to return to school.

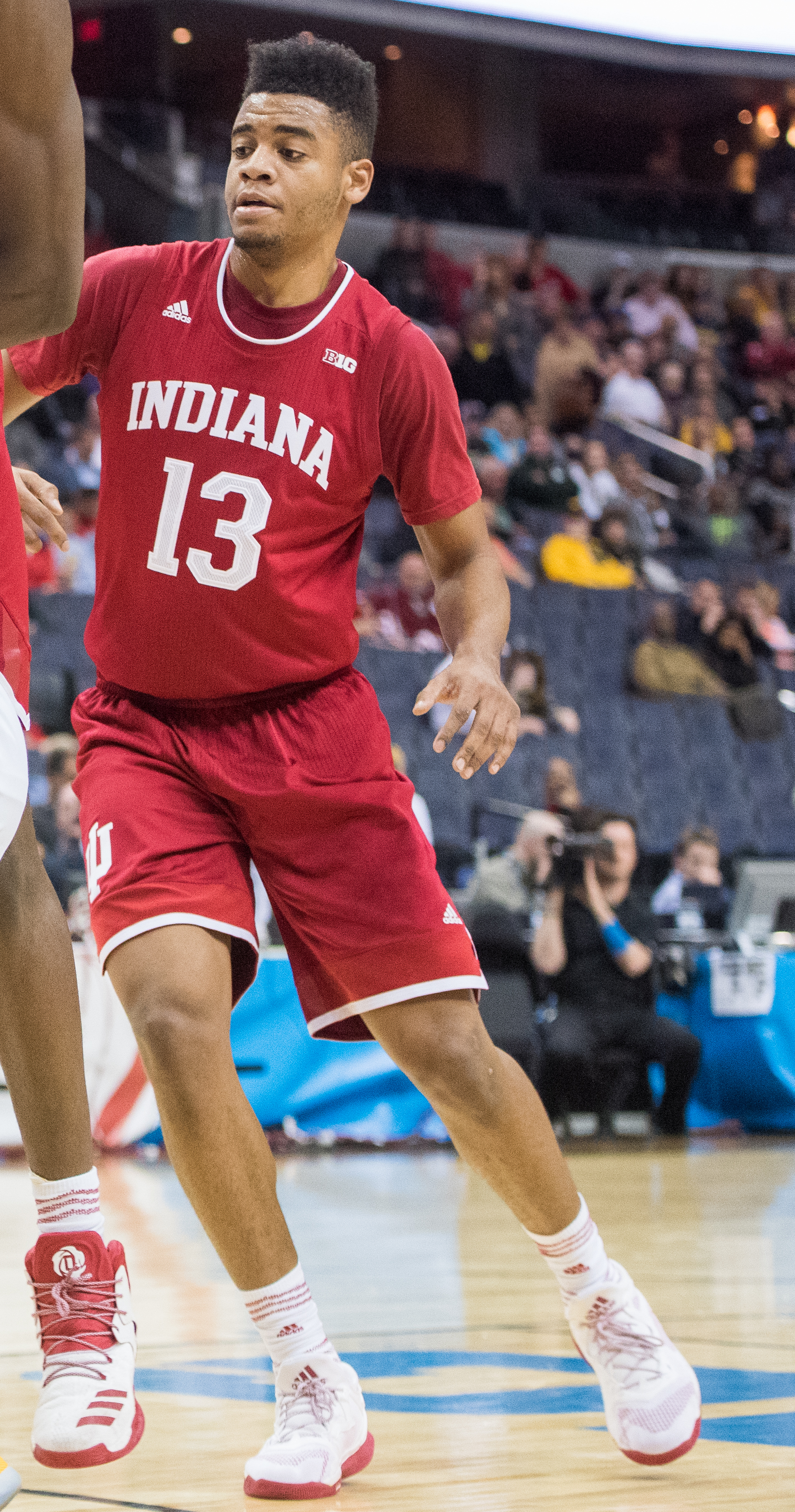
Morgan playing for Indiana

In the offseason before his senior season, Morgan received the “Off-season Champions” Award for his work in the conditioning program. He was named to the preseason All-Big Ten team.

In Morgan's senior year he was named the USBWA Oscar Robertson National Player of the week on December 17, the Big Ten Player of the Week, Preseason All Big Ten, and is Ranked 7th best senior by ESPN.com.

== Professional career ==
=== Salt Lake City Stars (2019) ===
After going undrafted in the 2019 NBA draft, Morgan was named in the Utah Jazz mini-camp roster for 2019 NBA Summer League. On August 21, 2019, Morgan signed an Exhibit 10 contract with the Jazz. He was waived in the preseason, on October 17, 2019, then added to the roster of their NBA G League affiliate, the Salt Lake City Stars and opening night roster

=== Utah Jazz (2019–2021) ===
On November 21, 2019, Morgan signed a two-way contract with the Utah Jazz, spending the rest of the season with the Jazz and the Salt Lake City Stars. On December 1, 2020, he re-signed with the Jazz.

=== Maine Celtics (2021) ===
On September 28, 2021, Morgan signed with the Boston Celtics. However, he was waived on October 16. On October 23, Morgan signed with the Maine Celtics. In 13 games, he averaged 12.6 points on .559/.388/.867 shooting, 7.0 rebounds, and 2.3 assists in 31.6 minutes per game.

=== Toronto Raptors (2021–2022) ===
On December 22, 2021, Morgan signed a 10-day contract with the Toronto Raptors.

=== Boston / Maine Celtics (2022) ===
On January 1, 2022, Morgan was reacquired by the Maine Celtics after his 10-day contract expired. On March 28, he signed a 10-day contract with the Boston Celtics. On April 9, he signed a multi-year deal with the Celtics, allowing him to play through the playoffs. The Celtics reached the 2022 NBA Finals, but lost to the Golden State Warriors in 6 games.

On July 9, 2022, Morgan was traded, alongside Nik Stauskas, Aaron Nesmith, Malik Fitts, Daniel Theis and a 2023 first-round pick, to the Indiana Pacers in exchange for Malcolm Brogdon. On July 14, Morgan was waived by the Pacers.

=== Ontario Clippers (2022–2023) ===
On September 24, 2022, Morgan signed with the Los Angeles Clippers, but was released 12 days later on October 4. On October 24, he joined the Ontario Clippers training camp roster.

=== Runa Basket Moscow (2023–2024) ===
On September 11, 2023, Morgan signed with Runa Basket Moscow of the VTB United League.

== Career statistics ==
Legend
GP	Games played	GS	Games started	MPG	Minutes per game
FG%	Field goal percentage	3P%	3-point field goal percentage	FT%	Free throw percentage
RPG	Rebounds per game	APG	Assists per game	SPG	Steals per game
BPG	Blocks per game	PPG	Points per game	**Bold**	Career high

=== NBA ===
==== Regular season ====
Year	Team	GP	GS	MPG	FG%	3P%	FT%	RPG	APG	SPG	BPG	PPG
2019–20	Utah	21	0	6.4	.577	.375	**.750**	1.4	.3	.0	**.1**	1.7
2020–21	Utah	**29**	0	5.1	.467	.308	.429	1.0	.3	**.1**	.0	1.2
2021–22	Toronto	1	0	**27.0**	**.667**	**.500**	—	**4.0**	**1.0**	.0	.0	**5.0**
2021–22	Boston	1	0	4.0	—	—	—	.0	.0	.0	.0	.0
Career		52	0	6.0	.525	.348	.545	1.2	.3	.1	.1	1.5

==== Playoffs ====
Year	Team	GP	GS	MPG	FG%	3P%	FT%	RPG	APG	SPG	BPG	PPG
2020	Utah	**7**	**2**	**12.4**	**.250**	**.200**	.333	**3.0**	**.7**	**.3**	.0	**1.4**
2021	Utah	2	0	3.0	—	—	—	1.0	.5	.0	.0	1.4
2022	Boston	9	0	1.7	.000	.000	**.500**	.3	.0	.0	.0	.1
Career		18	2	5.9	.231	.182	.375	1.4	.3	.1	.0	.6

=== College ===
Year	Team	GP	GS	MPG	FG%	3P%	FT%	RPG	APG	SPG	BPG	PPG
2015–16	Indiana	30	0	9.1	.512	**.455**	**.800**	2.1	.2	.3	.4	2.4
2016–17	Indiana	32	20	22.6	.548	.250	.739	5.6	1.1	.6	.9	7.7
2017–18	Indiana	31	30	29.4	**.579**	.302	.631	7.4	1.5	**1.2**	1.4	**16.5**
2018–19	Indiana	**35**	**35**	**29.9**	.558	.295	.647	**8.2**	**1.9**	**1.2**	**1.5**	15.5
Career		128	85	23.1	.562	.297	.671	5.9	1.2	.8	1.1	10.7
