= Payton Pritchard =

American basketball player (born 1998)

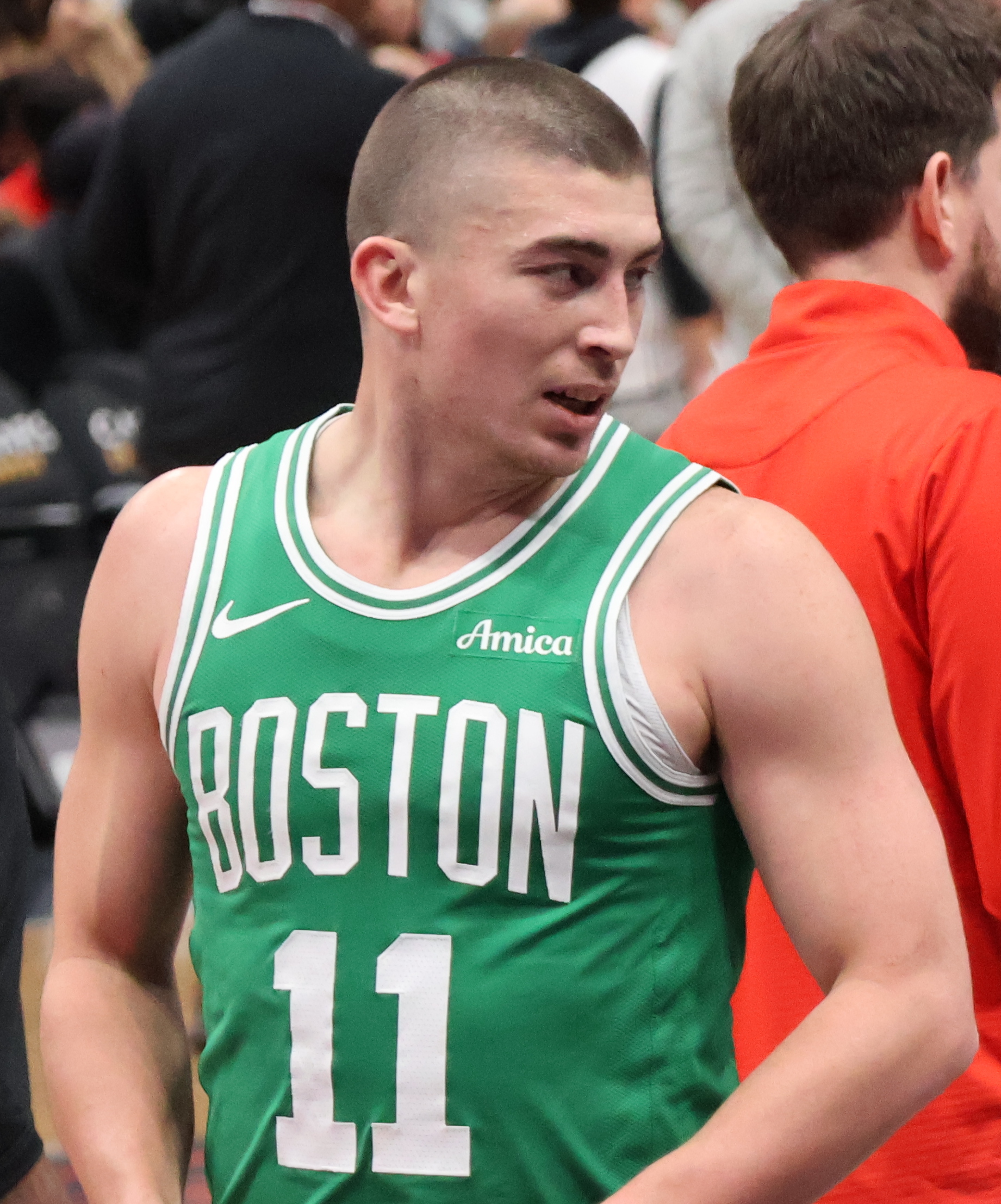
- Pritchard with the Boston Celtics in 2024

No. 11 – Boston Celtics
- Position: Point guard / shooting guard
- League: NBA

Personal information
- Born: January 28, 1998 (age 28) Tualatin, Oregon, U.S.
- Listed height: 6 ft 1 in (1.85 m)
- Listed weight: 212 lb (96 kg)

Career information
- High school: West Linn (West Linn, Oregon)
- College: Oregon (2016–2020)
- NBA draft: 2020: 1st round, 26th overall pick
- Drafted by: Boston Celtics
- Playing career: 2020–present

Career history
- 2020–present: Boston Celtics

Career highlights
- NBA champion (2024); NBA Sixth Man of the Year (2025); Lute Olson Award (2020); Bob Cousy Award (2020); Consensus first-team All-American (2020); Pac-12 Player of the Year (2020); First-team All-Pac-12 (2020); Second-team All-Pac-12 (2018); Pac-12 tournament MOP (2019)
- Stats at NBA.com
- Stats at Basketball Reference
Medals
Men's basketball
Representing United States
FIBA Under-19 World Cup
Bronze medal – third place	2017 Egypt	Team competition

Payton Michael Pritchard (born January 28, 1998) is an American professional basketball player for the Boston Celtics of the National Basketball Association (NBA). He played college basketball for the Oregon Ducks, where he earned second-team all-conference honors in the Pac-12 as a sophomore. Pritchard was a finalist for the Naismith College Player of the Year in his senior year. Selected 26th overall in the 2020 NBA draft by the Celtics, Pritchard reached the NBA Finals with the team in both 2022 and 2024, securing a championship in 2024. In 2025, he was named NBA Sixth Man of the Year.

== Early life ==
Pritchard won four consecutive state titles with West Linn High School and earned 2014 and 2015 Todd Pratt Player of the Year, Oregon Class 6a Player of the Year and Gatorade Oregon Player of the Year 2015. He averaged 22 points and 5.8 assists per game as a junior (2014–15) and 23.6 points, 6.8 assists and 3.1 steals as a senior (2015–16). A four-star recruit in the ESPN ranking, Pritchard committed to the University of Oregon Ducks in August 2015. He had previously committed to Oklahoma, where his father Terry played football. Pritchard scored 45 points in the Northwest Shootout, an all-star game between players from Oregon and Washington.

== College career ==
In his freshman year (2016–17), Pritchard made 39 appearances for the Ducks, averaging 7.4 points and 3.6 assists per game. In a game against UCLA, he made a deep three-point shot to pull the Ducks within one point and assisted on Dillon Brooks' game-winning three-pointer over Lonzo Ball. Oregon made its first Final Four appearance since the first NCAA tournament ever, and Pritchard was the only freshman to start in that year's Final Four.

On November 25, 2017, Pritchard scored a career-high 29 points to go along with eight assists and six rebounds in an 84–79 victory over DePaul. He was the lone returning starter for the Ducks in his sophomore year (2017–18) and averaged a markedly higher 14.5 points, 4.8 assists and 3.6 rebounds per game.

As a junior, Pritchard got off to a disappointing start but improved his play late in the season, leading Oregon to an improbable Pac-12 Tournament Championship and reaching the Sweet 16 of the NCAA Tournament. Pritchard averaged 12.9 points, 4.6 assists and 3.9 rebounds per game and was named MVP of the Pac-12 Tournament. After the season, he declared for the 2019 NBA draft but later decided to return to Oregon for his senior season.

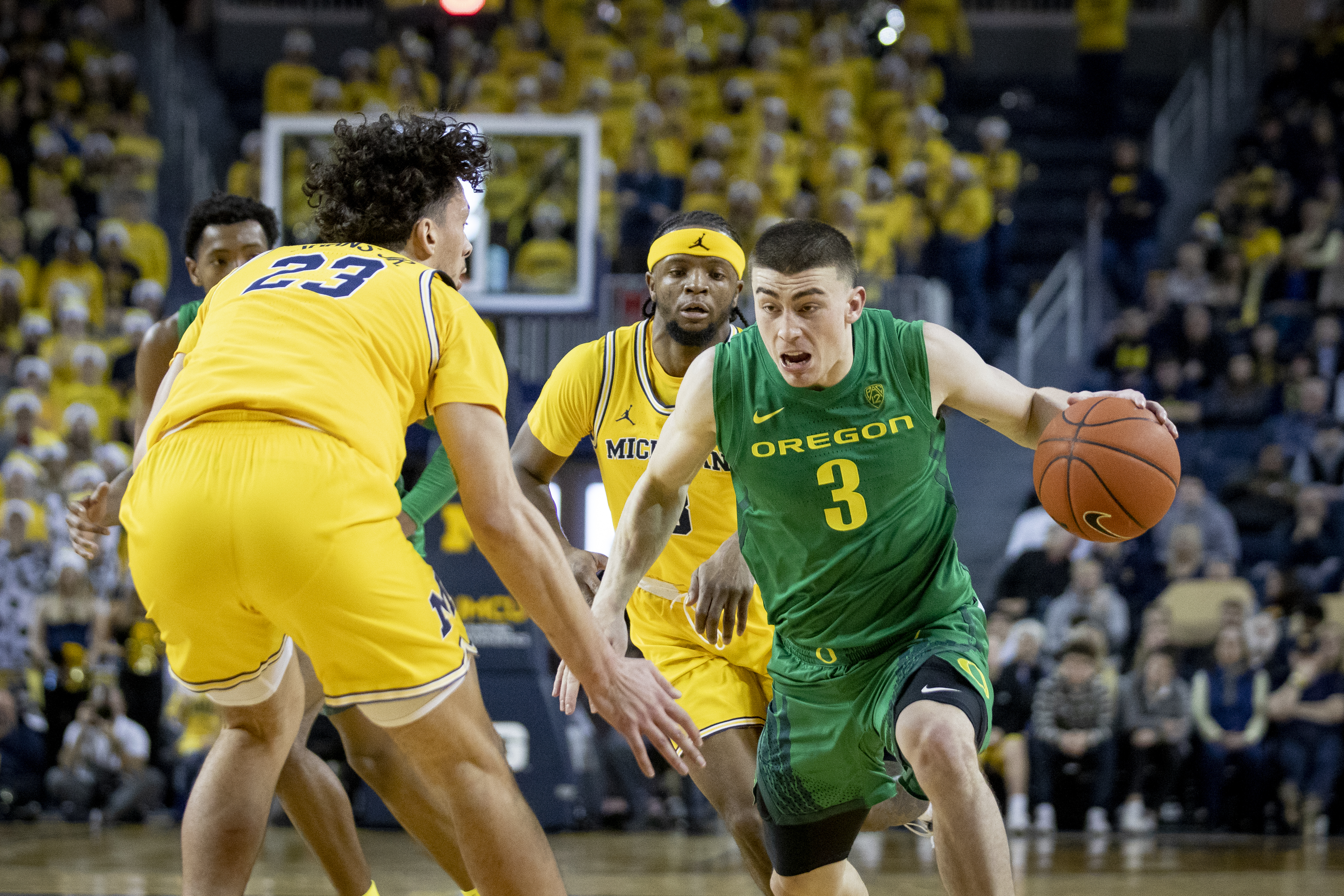
Pritchard in 2019

As a senior, Pritchard was one of the best players in collegiate basketball. On January 18, 2020, against Washington, he scored 22 points and made a 30-foot shot with three seconds left to complete a 16-point comeback as Oregon won in overtime 64–61. On January 30, Pritchard had 21 points in a 77–72 victory over California and became Oregon's all-time assists leader. He scored a career-high 38 points in a narrow 73–72 overtime victory over Arizona on February 22 in a must-win game to keep Oregon's hopes for a Pac-12 regular season title alive. Pritchard finished the job in Oregon's regular-season finale with 29 points against Stanford, securing Oregon's second Pac-12 regular season title during his career. As a senior, Pritchard averaged 20.5 points, 5.5 assists and 4.3 rebounds per game, and he was named the Pac-12 Player of the Year. Pritchard was also a consensus All-American selection and was awarded the Bob Cousy Award as the nation's top point guard.

== Professional career ==
=== Boston Celtics (2020–present) ===
==== 2020–21 season: Rookie year ====
Pritchard was selected with the 26th pick in the first round of the 2020 NBA draft by the Boston Celtics. On November 24, 2020, he signed a four-year, $10.5 million rookie contract with the Boston Celtics including team options in the third and fourth years. Pritchard impressed in his professional debut scoring 17 points in a preseason game against the Philadelphia 76ers on December 15. In the absence of Kemba Walker, Pritchard was fourth in playing time through the first five games, behind only Jayson Tatum, Jaylen Brown, and Marcus Smart. On January 4, 2021, Pritchard scored a career-high 23 points in a 126–114 victory over the Toronto Raptors with eight assists and two rebounds. In the next game two days later, he made the game-winning layup in a narrow 107–105 victory over the Miami Heat. On January 12, Pritchard earned his first NBA start, but had an underwhelming performance, scoring only two points in 28 minutes in a 96–93 loss to the Detroit Pistons. This showing came in the beginning stages of what can be described as his "rookie wall", where Pritchard struggled to be as efficient and impactful as he was early in the season. Pritchard alluded to his struggles later on in the season, but seemingly burst through this looming "rookie wall" in mid-April when he scored in double figures in six of seven games in a row including a then-career-best 28 points in a 119–115 loss to the Oklahoma City Thunder on April 27.

==== 2021–22 season: First NBA Finals ====
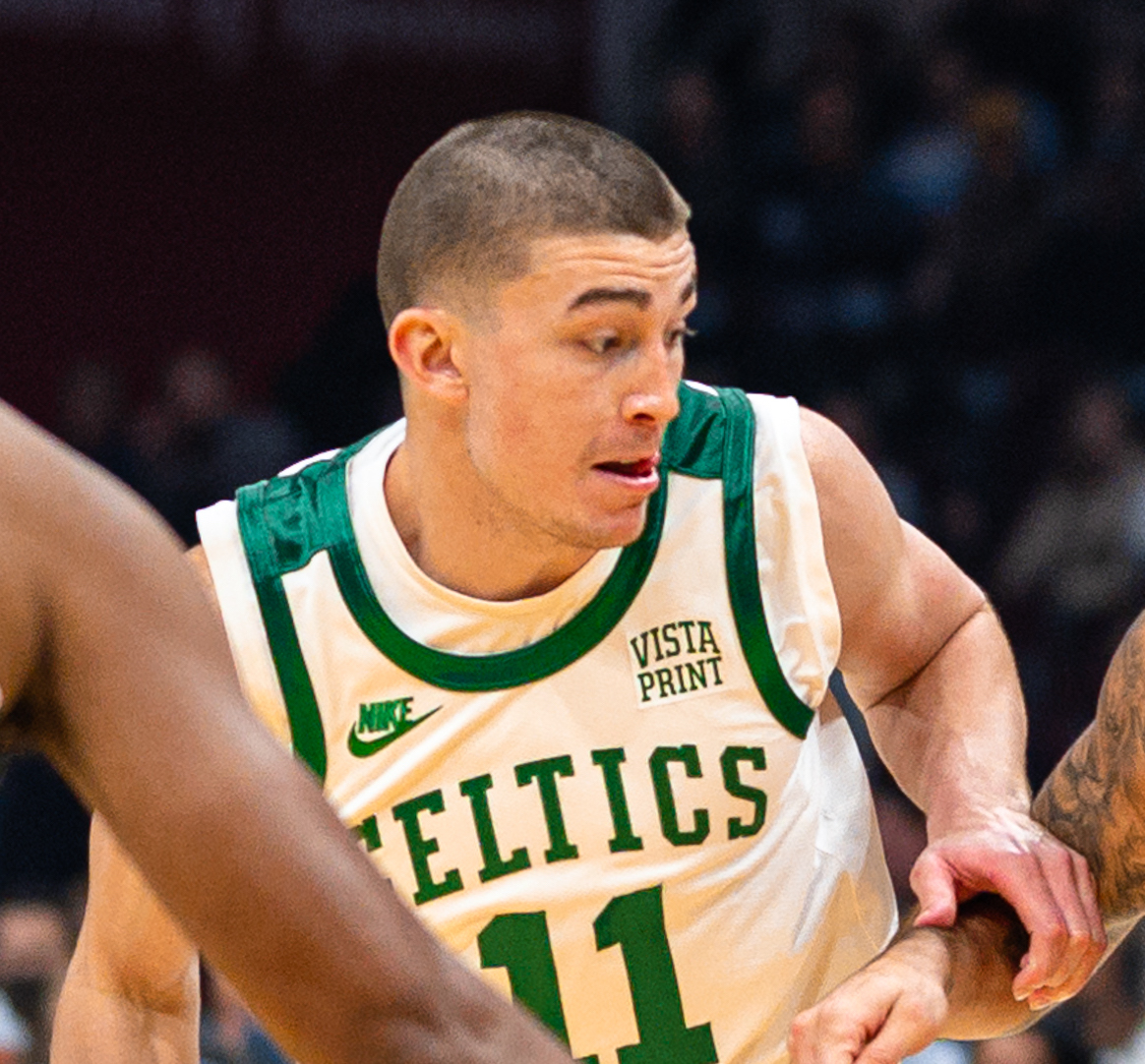
Pritchard in 2021

Pritchard played for the Celtics in the 2021 NBA Summer League and was named All-Summer League First Team after averaging 17 points and eight assists. He helped the Celtics reach the 2022 NBA Finals, where they lost to the Golden State Warriors in six games.

==== 2022–23 season: First triple-double ====
In the regular-season finale, Pritchard tallied his first career triple-double by putting up a career-high 30 points, a career-high 14 rebounds, and a career-high 11 assists in a 120–114 victory over the Atlanta Hawks. The game was played primarily by back-ups on each team. Following the Celtics' exit from the playoffs in the Eastern Conference Finals and due to limited minutes, Pritchard requested a trade.

==== 2023–24 season: Contract extension and First NBA Championship ====
On October 8, 2023, the Celtics and Pritchard agreed to a fully guaranteed four-year, $30 million contract extension. During the season, he saw increased playing time, averaging 22.3 minutes per game, and was the only player on the Celtics roster to play in all 82 regular-season games.

On April 12, 2024, Pritchard scored a career-high 32 points while also recording with 11 assists, three rebounds and a steal in a 131–96 victory over the Charlotte Hornets, becoming the first Celtics player in the play-by-play era to record 23 points and nine assists in the first half. Two days later against the Washington Wizards in the regular-season finale, he set another career-high of 38 points while also recording 12 assists and nine rebounds in a 132–122 victory, becoming the second Celtics player to put up at least 20 points and six assists in the first half in two consecutive games. Pritchard joined John Havlicek, Larry Bird, and Bob Cousy as the only players in franchise history to record back-to-back 30-point, 10-assist double-doubles.

During Game 2 of the 2024 NBA Finals against the Dallas Mavericks on June 9, Pritchard made a 34-foot three-pointer at the buzzer to end the third quarter as the Celtics won 105–98. Eight days later in Game 5, he made a half-court shot at the buzzer to end the first half of the close-out 106–88 victory, giving Pritchard his first NBA championship. According to the NBA, it was the longest made basket in an NBA Finals game since 1997; an NBA graphic gave the distance at 50 feet, while play-by-play results called it a 43-foot shot.

==== 2024–25 season: Sixth Man of the Year ====
On March 5, 2025, Pritchard had a career-high 43 points in addition to 10 rebounds and five assists in a 128–118 victory over the Portland Trail Blazers as he and Derrick White became the first Celtics teammates to make nine or more three-pointers in the same game (Pritchard had 10) and the first to score 40 or more points in the same game (White had 41). They are also the first NBA teammates to score 19 three-pointers in a single game, and the first to have at least 40 points and seven three-pointers each. Ten days later in a 115–113 victory over the Brooklyn Nets, Pritchard recorded 22 points, six rebounds, and three assists while making his 219th three-pointer of the season, setting an NBA record for season three-pointers made off the bench. On April 4 against the Phoenix Suns, Pritchard had 10 points, a rebound, and three assists while scoring the three-pointer that gave the 2024–25 Celtics the record for most three-pointers by a team in a season with 1,364. In the regular-season finale nine days later against the Charlotte Hornets, he recorded 34 points, seven rebounds, and seven assists during the 93–86 victory.

On April 20, in Game 1 of the first round of the playoffs against the Orlando Magic, Pritchard scored 19 points in 25 minutes off the bench during the 103–86 victory. That same day, he was named a finalist for the NBA Sixth Man of the Year award. Pritchard was announced as the winner of the award on April 22; he received 82 of 100 first-place votes, and was the only player listed on every ballot. Pritchard also received four votes (one second-place, three third-place) for NBA Most Improved Player.

==== 2025–26 season: Transition to starter ====
Due to the offseason departure of Jrue Holiday and a potential season-ending injury to Jayson Tatum, Pritchard moved to the starting lineup. On November 30, 2025, Pritchard scored 42 points on 15-of-22 shooting during a 117–115 victory over the Cleveland Cavaliers. He made 79 appearances (including a career-high 50 starts) for Boston during the regular season, recording averages of 17.0 points, 3.9 rebounds, and 5.2 assists, all of which were career-high marks. On April 26, 2026, Pritchard had a playoff career-high 32 points in a 128-96 victory over the Philadelphia 76ers in Game 4 of the first round.

==== 2026–27 season: Contract extension ====
On October 13, 2026, Pritchard signed a two-year, $44.2 million contract extension with the Celtics. On October 26, 2026, Pritchard led the Celtics in scoring with 28 points against the Chicago Bulls in a 134-99 win.

== National team career ==
Pritchard represented the United States at the 2015 FIBA 3x3 Under-18 World Championship where, in his best game, he had nine three-pointers against Poland. Pritchard scored 12 points on four three-pointers in 14 minutes as a member of the USA National Select Team at the 2016 Nike Hoop Summit.

Pritchard also made the U.S. squad for the 2017 FIBA U19 World Cup in Egypt. He averaged 9.0 points, 3.1 assists and 2.9 rebounds per contest during the tournament, including 16 points against RJ Barrett and Canada. Team USA won the bronze medal, and Pritchard was named to the All-Star Five.

== Personal life ==
Pritchard married YouTuber Emma MacDonald in August 2024. The ceremony was officiated by his former Celtics teammate Blake Griffin.

== Career statistics ==
Legend
GP	Games played	GS	Games started	MPG	Minutes per game
FG%	Field goal percentage	3P%	3-point field goal percentage	FT%	Free throw percentage
RPG	Rebounds per game	APG	Assists per game	SPG	Steals per game
BPG	Blocks per game	PPG	Points per game	**Bold**	Career high
†	Won an NBA championship

=== NBA ===
==== Regular season ====
Year	Team	GP	GS	MPG	FG%	3P%	FT%	RPG	APG	SPG	BPG	PPG
2020–21	Boston	66	4	19.2	.440	.411	.889	2.4	1.8	.6	.1	7.7
2021–22	Boston	71	2	14.1	.429	**.412**	**1.000**	1.9	2.0	.4	.1	6.2
2022–23	Boston	48	3	13.4	.412	.364	.750	1.8	1.3	.3	.0	5.6
2023–24†	Boston	**82**	5	22.3	.468	.385	.821	3.2	3.4	.5	.1	9.6
2024–25	Boston	80	3	28.4	**.472**	.407	.845	3.8	3.5	**.9**	**.2**	14.3
2025-26	Boston	79	**50**	**32.4**	.464	.377	.890	**3.9**	**5.2**	.7	.1	**17.0**
Career		426	67	22.5	.457	.394	.869	3.0	3.0	.6	.1	10.6

==== Playoffs ====
Year	Team	GP	GS	MPG	FG%	3P%	FT%	RPG	APG	SPG	BPG	PPG
2021	Boston	5	0	13.5	.353	.300	**1.000**	1.8	2.4	.4	.0	3.4
2022	Boston	**24**	0	12.9	.422	.333	.667	1.9	1.6	.3	**.1**	4.8
2023	Boston	10	0	5.7	**.545**	.400	.800	.6	1.1	.1	.0	3.2
2024†	Boston	19	0	18.7	.419	.383	.917	1.9	2.1	.2	.0	6.4
2025	Boston	11	0	27.5	.455	**.403**	.824	2.3	1.5	**.5**	.0	11.9
2026	Boston	7	0	**33.0**	.424	.309	.875	**3.7**	**5.1**	.4	.0	**14.6**
Career		76	0	17.4	.432	.358	.840	2.0	2.0	.3	.0	6.8

=== College ===
Year	Team	GP	GS	MPG	FG%	3P%	FT%	RPG	APG	SPG	BPG	PPG
2016–17	Oregon	**39**	35	28.3	.393	.350	.730	3.4	3.6	1.2	**.1**	7.4
2017–18	Oregon	36	36	35.1	.447	.413	.774	3.8	4.8	1.4	.0	14.5
2018–19	Oregon	38	**38**	35.5	.418	.328	**.838**	3.9	4.6	**1.8**	**.1**	12.9
2019–20	Oregon	31	31	**36.6**	**.468**	**.415**	.821	**4.3**	**5.5**	1.5	.0	**20.5**
Career		144	140	33.7	.437	.379	.800	3.8	4.6	1.5	.0	13.5
