= List of disasters in Missouri by death toll =

This list of disasters in Missouri by death toll includes major disasters (excluding acts of war) that occurred in Missouri.

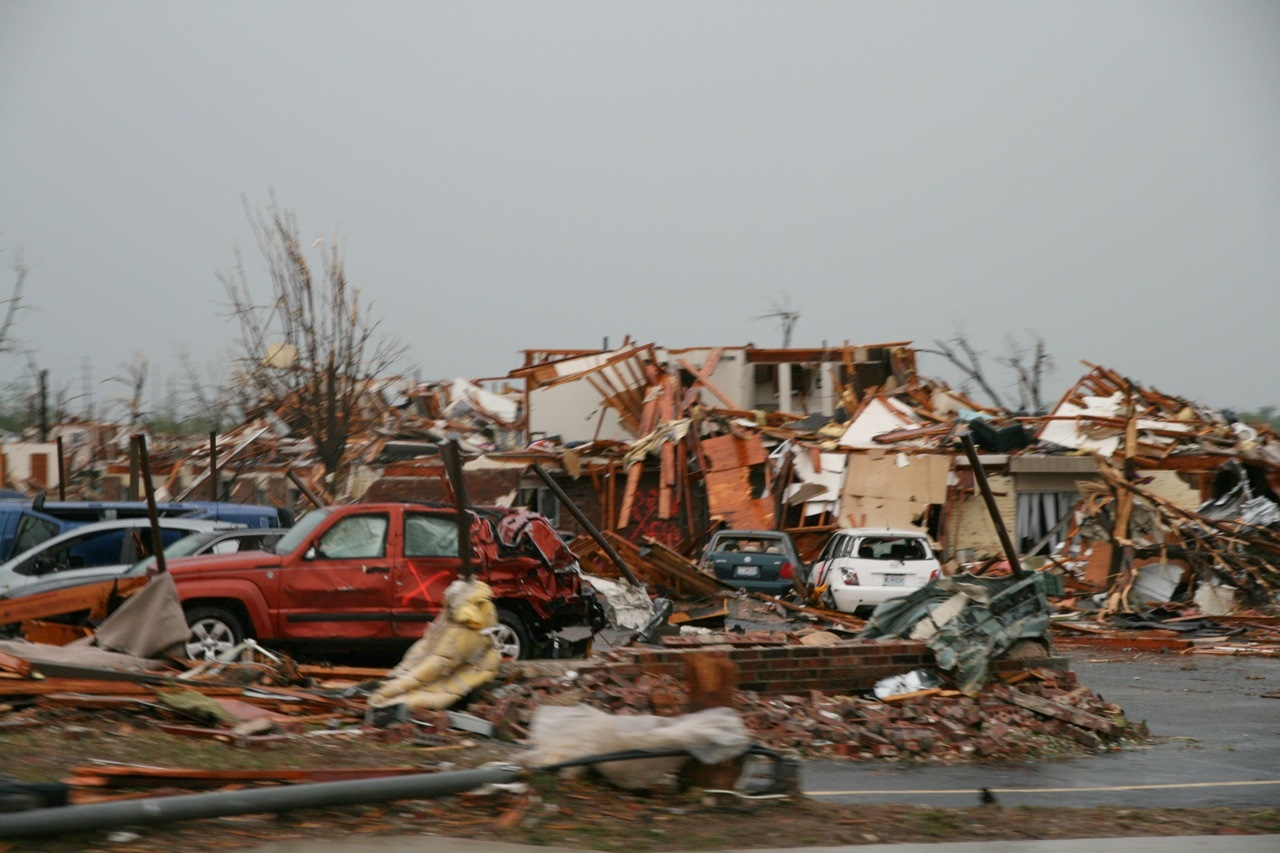
The Joplin tornado is one of the deadliest disasters in Missouri's modern history

== 100 or more deaths ==
Fatalities	Year	Article	Type	Location	Comments
255+	1896	1896 St. Louis–East St. Louis tornado	Tornado	St. Louis	
162	2011	Joplin tornado	Tornado	Joplin	
114	1981	Hyatt Regency walkway collapse	Walkway collapse	Kansas City	
100+	1852	Saluda disaster	Shipwreck	Lexington	

== 50 to 99 deaths ==
Fatalities	Year	Article	Type	Location	Comments
99	1880	Marshfield Cyclone	Tornado	Marshfield	
85	1927	Poplar Bluff tornado	Tornado outbreak	Poplar Bluff	
84	1927	1927 St. Louis tornado	Tornado	St. Louis	
72	1957	Warrenton Nursing Home fire	Structure fire	Warrenton	
67 (Missouri)	1917	May–June 1917 tornado outbreak sequence	Tornado outbreak	Statewide	
59 (Missouri)	1957	Tornado outbreak of May 19–22, 1957	Tornado outbreak	Southeast Missouri	

== 10 to 49 deaths ==
Fatalities	Year	Article	Type	Location	Comments
45	1962	Continental Airlines Flight 11	Terrorism	Union Township, Putnam County	
38 (Missouri)	1957	1957 Ruskin Heights tornado	Tornado	Kansas City area	Part of the 1957 outbreak
38	1973	Ozark Air Lines Flight 809	Plane crash	Normandy (St. Louis Lambert International Airport)	
30+	1855	Gasconade Bridge train disaster	Bridge collapse	Gasconade	
30	1916	Tornado outbreak of June 5–6, 1916	Tornado outbreak	Statewide	
30	1955	American Airlines Flight 476	Plane crash	Fort Leonard Wood	
28	1951	Great Flood of 1951	Flood	Eastern Missouri	Historically difficult to isolate the casualties in Kansas from the casualties in Missouri, the casualties just in Missouri may be lower.
27 (Missouri)	1993	Great Flood of 1993	Flood	Statewide	
23	1949	Cape Girardeau tornado	Tornado	Cape Girardeau	
22 (Missouri)	2003	Tornado outbreak sequence of May 3–11, 2003	Tornado outbreak	Central Missouri	
21	1959	Crescent–St. Louis tornado	Tornado	St. Louis area	
21	1877	Old Southern Hotel fire	Structure fire	St. Louis	
20	1978	Coates House Fire	Structure fire	Kansas City	
18	1917	Ellsinore-Drum tornado	Tornado	Carter, Wayne, and Bollinger counties	Part of the 1917 tornado outbreak
18	1870	1870 St. Charles Bridge disaster	Bridge collapse	St. Charles	
17	2018	Table Rock Lake duck boat accident	Shipwreck	Table Rock Lake near Branson	
15 (Missouri)	2008	2008 Picher–Neosho tornado	Tornado	Newton County	
13	2004	Corporate Airlines Flight 5966	Plane crash	Adair County	
13	1955	American Airlines Flight 711	Plane crash	Springfield–Branson National Airport	
12	2026	2026 Butler PAC P-750 crash	Plane crash	Butler, Bates County	
11	1925	1925 Tri-State tornado outbreak	Tornado outbreak	Statewide	
11	1952	Cooter–Cottonwood Point tornado	Tornado	Pemiscot County	
10	1917	Manes-Anutt tornado	Tornado	Wright, Texas, Phelps, and Dent counties	Part of the 1917 tornado outbreak
10	1917	Success-Melzo tornado	Tornado	SE central Missouri	Part of the 1917 tornado outbreak
