= Tornado outbreak sequence of May 25 – June 1, 1917 =

1917 extreme weather event in US Southeast and Midwest

Tornado outbreak sequence of May 25–June 1, 1917
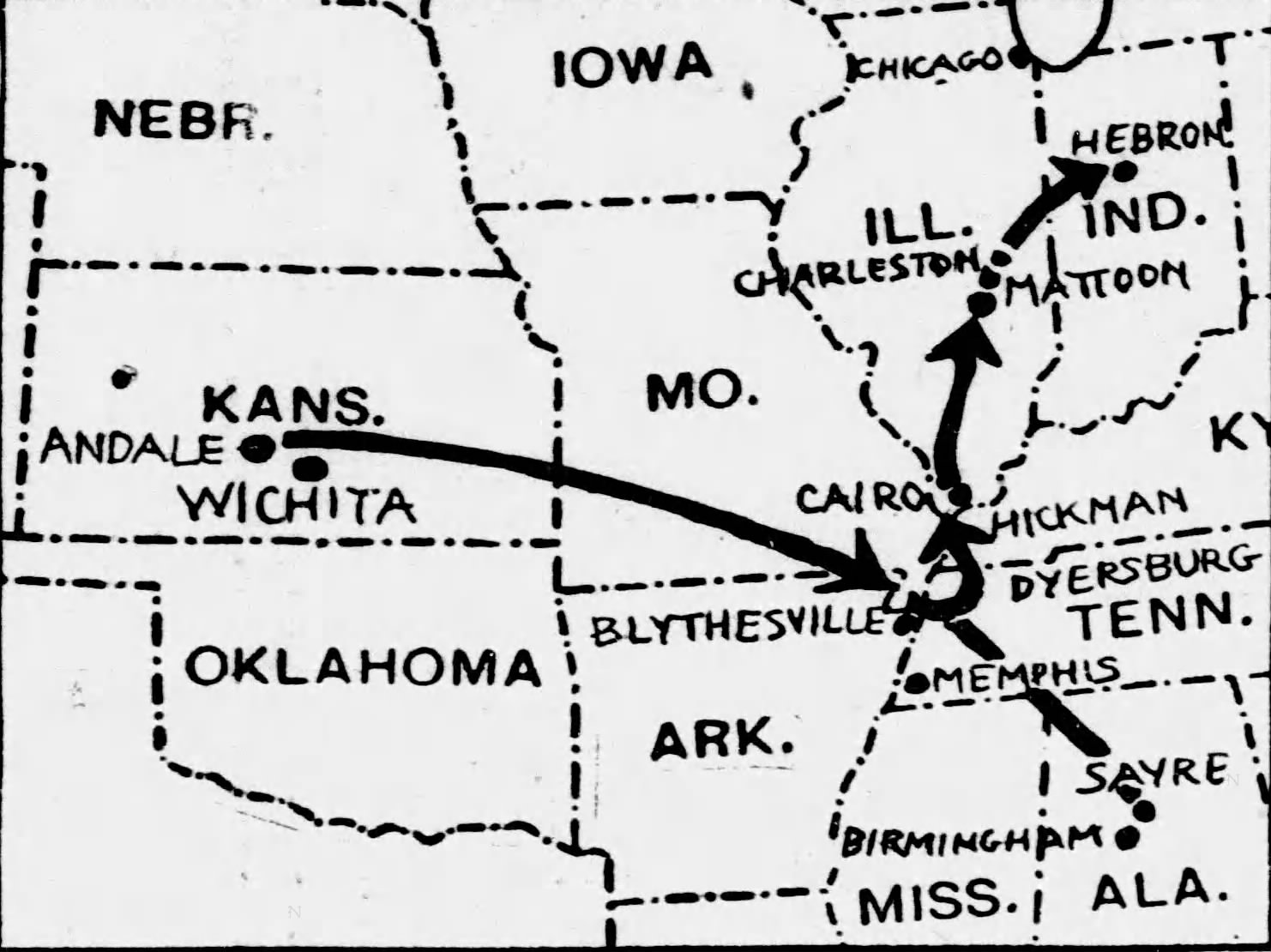
- Map of where deadly tornadoes happened from May 25 - June 1, 1917

Meteorological history
- Duration: May 25–June 1, 1917

Tornado outbreak
- Tornadoes: ≥ 66
- Max. rating: F5 tornado
- Duration: 8 days

Overall effects
- Casualties: ≥ 383 fatalities, unknown injuries
- Damage: > $6.88 million (1917 USD); >$173 million (2025 USD)

An eight-day tornado event, known as a tornado outbreak sequence, killed at least 383 people, mostly in the Midwestern and parts of the Southeastern United States, between May 25 and June 1, 1917. It was one of the most intense and longest continuous tornado outbreak sequence on record, with at least 66 tornadoes including 15 that were analyzed to have been violent (F4–F5) based upon reported damage. (Note: An outbreak is generally defined as a group of at least six tornadoes (the number sometimes varies slightly according to local climatology) with no more than a six-hour gap between individual tornadoes. An outbreak sequence, prior to (after) modern records that began in 1950, is defined as, at most, two (one) consecutive days without at least one significant (F2 or stronger) tornado.) The deadliest tornado of the entire sequence produced a 155-mile (249 km) track across Illinois on May 26th, killing 108 people and devastating the towns of Charleston and Mattoon along with small farming communities. Once believed to have traveled 293-mile (472 km) across Illinois and into Indiana, it is now assessed to have been a tornado family of four to eight separate tornadoes. (Note: All damage totals are in 1917 United States dollars unless otherwise noted.) This tornado outbreak is one of only 3 outbreaks or outbreak sequences to reach the classification of a Super Outbreak, with an Outbreak Intensity Score of 296.

== Meteorological synopsis ==
A series of low-pressure areas affected the Central and Eastern United States between May 25 and June 1, 1917. The first of these developed by May 25 east of the Rocky Mountains in eastern Colorado. By 7:00 p.m. CST/0100 UTC that day, it intensified to 29.45 inches of mercury (997.3 mb) with temperatures rising at or above 70 °F (21.1 °C) over most of Kansas. The next day, the low-pressure system deepened further into the morning, eventually centering near Yankton, South Dakota, about 7 a.m. CST/1300 UTC. Upon weakening to about 29.55 inHg (1,000.7 mb) in the evening and centering near Des Moines, Iowa, the low was followed by another surface low which formed over the Texas Panhandle and moved northeast. This second low passed near Oklahoma City, Oklahoma, on the morning of May 27 and approached the St. Louis, Missouri, area in the evening. On May 30, yet another low of about 29.5 inHg (999.0 mb) by 7 p.m. CST/0100 UTC moved northeast from near Concordia, Kansas, to Des Moines.

== List of tornadoes ==
Confirmed tornadoes by Fujita rating
FU	F0	F1	F2	F3	F4	F5	Total
5	0	1	28	17	14	1	66

These numbers are likely gross underestimates. Several of the long-track events listed below are likely to be tornado families, or groups of tornadoes produced by the same storm. Because of insufficient documentation, and lack of a proper storm survey by meteorologists, it is impossible to determine where one tornado ends and another begins in certain cases. Additionally, the book by Grazulis which details the tornadoes of this event only documents "significant" tornadoes, that is, tornadoes which caused fatalities or F2 or greater damage on the Fujita scale. On average, almost 70% of tornadoes are not "significant".

=== May 25 event ===
List of tornadoes - May 25, 1917
F#	Location	County	Coord.	Time (UTC)	Path length	Comments/Damage
Kansas
F2	NW of Jennings	Decatur	39.77°N 100.40°W	1830	4 miles (6.4 km)	Tornado destroyed two barns.
F5	NNW of Cheney to NE of Florence	Sedgwick, Harvey, Marion	37.68°N 97.81°W	2000	65 miles (105 km)	23 deaths — Destroyed 118 buildings, with many swept away. Hardest-hit areas were the southeastern part of Andale (12 deaths) and the southern edge of Sedgwick, where eight people died. Three more died in rural areas near McLain and Elbing. The tornado dissipated northeast of Florence. Average path width was 1,200 yards (0.68 mi) .
F2	S of Sylvan Grove	Lincoln	38.96°N 98.39°W	2100	unknown	Destroyed one barn.
F2	Near Fall River	Elk, Greenwood, Wilson, Woodson	37.60°N 96.03°W	2315	18 miles (29 km)	Damaged 20 farm sites and destroyed at least five barns.
F3	NW of Howard to S of New Albany	Elk, Wilson	37.52°N 96.32°W	2000	25 miles (40 km)	1 death - Destroyed more than 12 farms, and one woman was killed.
Nebraska
F2	Ogallala	Keith	41.13°N 101.72°W	2000	1 mile (1.6 km)	Brief tornado moved a chicken house, then damaged a house and law office. Two children injured by airborne glass.
Sources: Grazulis 1993

=== May 26 event ===
List of tornadoes - May 26, 1917
F#	Location	County	Coord.	Time (UTC)	Path length	Comments/Damage
Missouri
FU	Near Louisiana	Pike		before 1800	unknown	Brief tornado. Beginning of the Charleston–Mattoon, Illinois, tornado family.
Illinois
FU	Near Pleasant Hill	Pike		~1800	unknown	Brief touchdown. Was part of the Charleston–Mattoon tornado family.
F4	E of Nebo to Embarrass	Pike, Greene, Macoupin, Montgomery, Christian, Shelby, Coles	39.45°N 91.07°W	1810	155 miles (249 km)	108 deaths — See section on this tornado
F3	ESE of Charleston to Livingston	Coles, Clark	39.45°N 88.09°W	2145	25 miles (40 km)	Destroyed a farm and injured 15 people near northern Marshall. Possibly F4.
F4	Near Manhattan to NE of Crown Point, IN	Will, Lake (IN)	41.43°N 87.99°W	2245	33 miles (53 km)	3 deaths — Swept away three farmhouses in the Manhattan–Monee area. Later hit near Crete and in northern Crown Point. Hit numerous farms along its path.
FU	E of Chester	Randolph		2300	unknown	1 death — A "tornadic" thunderstorm blew down buildings just east of Chester.
FU	Near Willisville	Perry		2340	unknown	A "funnel-shaped cloud" caused $80,000 damage in Willisville.
FU	Near Hallidayboro	Jackson		0030	unknown	Slight damage occurred in Hallidayboro.
Indiana
F4	W of Blackhawk to S of Clay City	Vigo, Clay	39.31°N 87.31°W	2200	13 miles (21 km)	2 deaths — Completely swept away a large house south of Blackhawk, killing its two occupants. The funnel later turned into a downburst near Clay City.
F4	Near Clear Creek	Monroe	39.12°N 86.55°W	2245	5 miles (8.0 km)	Passed 3 miles (4.8 km) south of Bloomington, destroying 15 houses and causing near-F5 damage. The tornado also completely destroyed three farms.
F4	S of Crown Point to SE of Kouts	Lake, Porter	41.33°N 87.36°W	2340	20 miles (32 km)	4 deaths — Destroyed 12 farms and damaged 30 others before lifting. A railroad worker died in a boxcar and 25 other people were injured. Three other people were killed on their farms.
Sources: Grazulis, Significant, p. 752

=== May 27 event ===
List of tornadoes - May 27, 1917
F#	Location	County	Coord.	Time (UTC)	Path length	Comments/Damage
Missouri
F2	SW of Hurley to N of Ozark	Stone, Christian	36.92°N 93.51°W	1730	20 miles (32 km)	Caused 50 injuries, mainly near Hurley and Boaz. The tornado also destroyed eight farmhouses.
F1	Bruner to near Seymour	Christian, Webster	37.01°N 92.99°W	1800	13 miles (21 km)	1 death — Death caused by airborne debris.
F3	W of Ozark	Christian		1815	5 miles (8.0 km)	This tornado reportedly leveled some houses.
F2	E of Ava	Douglas		2015	unknown	Destroyed one house near Coldspring, injuring four people inside.
F3	S of St. Mary to Willisville, IL	Perry, Randolph (IL), Perry (IL)		2300	25 miles (40 km)	1 death — Destroyed six houses in Missouri and caused one death east of Chester, Illinois. The tornado also destroyed Willisville's business district and unroofed or damaged 20 other houses.
F2	W of Neosho	Newton		0315	5 miles (8.0 km)	Destroyed three houses and five barns in the Belfast community.
Arkansas
F4	S of Blytheville to S of Como, TN	Mississippi, Lauderdale (TN), Dyer (TN), Gibson (TN), Weakley (TN)		2100	75 miles (121 km)	18 deaths — Crossed into Tennessee near Tomato, Arkansas after causing six deaths in nearby tenant houses. The tornado killed seven other people in south Dyersburg, four more people south of Sharon, and one more person at Ore Springs (south of Como). Probably a tornado family that leveled many large homes in Tennessee.
F3	N of Manila to Big Lake	Mississippi		2230	5 miles (8.0 km)	Destroyed seven houses at Cottonwood Point before dissipating. The tornado allegedly carried livestock .25 miles (0.40 km).
Kentucky
F2	Bardwell	Carlisle		2130	unknown	1 death — Killed one person and destroyed many structures as it passed through downtown Bardwell.
Tennessee
F4	N of Tiptonville to near Dublin, KY	Lake, Fulton (KY), Hickman (KY), Graves (KY)		2200	50 miles (80 km)	67 deaths — Second-deadliest Kentucky tornado on record (65 deaths in-state), second only to the 1890 Louisville tornado (76-115 deaths). Forty-two people were killed in Fulton County, including 21 in the town of Bondurant.
F3	SW of Milan to N of Indian Mound	Gibson, Carroll, Henry, Benton, Stewart		2230	80 miles (130 km)	6 deaths — Long-lived tornado family destroyed houses and farms near Trezevant, Hico, and Manleyville.
F4	Near Finger to near Linden	McNairy, Chester, Henderson, Perry		0000	50 miles (80 km)	5 deaths — Fourth major tornado in Tennessee on the same day, probably from a family of tornadoes. It leveled 20 small houses in its path.
F2	N of Brentwood to Lebanon	Davidson, Wilson		0100	35 miles (56 km)	2 deaths — Fifth and final long-track tornado to affect Tennessee, hitting just south of Nashville. It damaged houses in Una, Bakertown, and Dodoburg.
Alabama
F3	S of Kansas to NE of Manchester	Walker		0245	17 miles (27 km)	9 deaths — Destructive tornado killed six people in northern Carbon Hill, destroying or damaging roughly 200 houses in a three-block-wide area.
F4	SE of Sumiton to E of Morris	Jefferson, Blount		0245	25 miles (40 km)	27 deaths — At least two devastating tornadoes, their paths inseparable, killed nine people in Sayre and 17 others in Bradford. It flattened many small houses and killed an infant in Blount County before dissipating.
F2	Near Lees Chapel	Blount		0345	unknown	1 death — As many as four people may have died as a tornado destroyed small houses.
F3	Windham Springs	Tuscaloosa		0435	5 miles (8.0 km)	5 deaths — Destroyed 24 out of 25 houses in Windham Springs.
Sources: Grazulis, Significant, pp. 752–753

=== May 28 event ===
List of tornadoes - May 28, 1917
F#	Location	County	Time (UTC)	Path length	Comments/Damage
Alabama
F2	SE of Tuscaloosa to near Woodstock	Tuscaloosa, Bibb	0610	18 miles (29 km)	1 death — Destroyed 15 houses near Taylorville and Bibbville.
F2	Sylacauga	Talladega	0645	unknown	1 death — This (reportedly) highly visible tornado damaged numerous houses, businesses, and warehouses in downtown Sylacauga.
F3	SW of New Hope	Madison, Marshall, Jackson	0700	18 miles (29 km)	6 deaths — The final deadly tornado of the outbreak in Alabama destroyed 20 houses. The six fatalities occurred in six of the 20 houses.
Sources: Grazulis, Significant, pp. 752–753

=== May 30 event ===
List of tornadoes - May 30, 1917
F#	Location	County	Time (UTC)	Path length	Comments/Damage
Missouri
F4	W of Manes to near Anutt	Wright, Texas, Phelps, Dent	1830	55 miles (89 km)	10 deaths — Leveled farms and small houses near the Big Piney River, south of Hazleton, and northwest of Lenox. This long-track tornado passed only 5 miles (8.0 km) north of the next tornado path, listed below.
F4	W of Success to near Melzo	Texas, Dent, Crawford, Washington, St. Francois, Jefferson	1900	108 miles (174 km)	10 deaths — Major tornado or tornado family damaged or destroyed homes in Licking, Ranger, Salem, Eye, and Mineral Point. Most of Mineral Point was damaged with house leveled in the northern part of town.
F2	WSW of Fredericktown to near Libertyville	Madison, St. Francois	2200	15 miles (24 km)	Widely photographed tornado destroyed barns south of Knob Lick.
F3	Near Munger to S of Park Hills	Reynolds, Iron, St. Francois	2200	28 miles (45 km)	7 deaths — Leveled many houses in small communities near Munger, near Graniteville, south of Bismarck, and near Elvins and Flat River.
F2	S of Fredericktown	Madison	2230	9 miles (14 km)	3 deaths — Destroyed numerous farmhouses.
F4	NE of Ellsinore to near Drum	Carter, Wayne, Bollinger	2300	50 miles (80 km)	18 deaths — Simultaneously occurred with the next event, which was 4 miles (6.4 km) to the south before merging near Arab. The northern, stronger tornado damaged Granite Bend and several small communities before destroying Dongola and south Zalma. It caused significant F4 damage near Dongola and Zalma.
F3	NW of Hendrickson to ENE of Arab	Carter, Butler, Wayne, Bollinger	2300	50 miles (80 km)	8 deaths — Merged with the F4 tornado near Arab. The tornado passed south of Taskee and leveled two houses south of Chaonia Landing. The path widened to 1.5 miles (2.4 km) near Arab.
F2	N of Bloomsdale to SE of Brickeys Hollow	Ste. Genevieve, Randolph (IL)	2300	10 miles (16 km)	Moved from Lawrenceton into Illinois. In Missouri, the tornado destroyed four houses along with a church, a parsonage, and a blacksmith shop. It caused only minor damage in Illinois.
F3	N of Ozora to NW of Chester, IL	Ste. Genevieve, Randolph (IL)	0000	13 miles (21 km)	1 death — Destroyed four houses near Ozora then passed into Illinois near Fort Gage.
F3	W of Bloomfield to near Oran	Stoddard, Scott	0000	32 miles (51 km)	6 deaths — Developed west of Acorn Ridge and destroyed frail rural structures. It caused deaths at Zeta and Ardeola.
F2	Crowder to S of Blodgett	Scott	0015	10 miles (16 km)	The tornado destroyed at least 12 houses.
F2	S of Winona to N of Low Wassie	Shannon, Carter	0030	10 miles (16 km)	Four farms were destroyed. The track may have continued to near Ellington in Reynolds County.
F3	SW of Hornersville	Dunklin	0300	3 miles (4.8 km)	2 deaths — A well-constructed house was destroyed.
F2	W of Washington	Franklin	unknown	1 mile (1.6 km)	One house and many barns destroyed.
Sources: Grazulis, Significant, pp. 753–754

=== May 31 event ===
List of tornadoes - May 31, 1917
F#	Location	County	Time (UTC)	Path length	Comments/Damage
Texas
F2	Muenster to Gainesville	Cooke	0315	15 miles (24 km)	Funnel clouds observed at Lindsay and Gainesville, but most damage downburst-caused. Four houses, 12 barns, and many churches were destroyed.
Oklahoma
F4	NW of Marietta	Love	0330	8 miles (13 km)	3 deaths— Five houses were leveled outside Marietta. The town itself only received downburst-related damage.
Sources: Grazulis, Significant, pp. 753–754

=== June 1 event ===
List of tornadoes - June 1, 1917
F#	Location	County	Time (UTC)	Path length	Comments/Damage
Kentucky
F2	Viola	Graves	1230	5 miles (8.0 km)	Most of Viola was damaged or destroyed.
F2	Downtown Lexington	Fayette	1530	unknown	A tornado unroofed downtown buildings and structures at Sayre School.
F2	Near Earlington	Hopkins	2130	unknown	A tornado destroyed barns.
Oklahoma
F2	S of Guthrie	Logan	2000	unknown	A tornado leveled a barn and almost destroyed a house. Four or more other tornadoes, all F1 or weaker, hit Logan County on this day.
F2	S of Sapulpa	Creek	2100	unknown	A tornado destroyed a small house outside south Sapulpa.
F2	Between Drumright and Oilton	Creek	2100	unknown	A tornado destroyed a small house along with 15 oil derricks.
F3	S of Sulphur	Murray	2115	3 miles (4.8 km)	5 deaths— A tornado hit the Drake community, where one small house was completely swept away. A nearby school and another house were also destroyed.
F3	N of Seminole	Seminole	2200	7 miles (11 km)	Houses and barns were destroyed and the debris was carried miles away. 12 people were injured.
F2	S of Okmulgee	Okmulgee	2200	unknown	A tornado destroyed buildings plus 42 oil derricks.
F4	Clarita to Coalgate	Coal	2220	12 miles (19 km)	14 deaths— A tornado destroyed about 200 houses, some of them well-built, two-story structures. Losses reached $200,000. One book from Coalgate was found 40 miles (64 km) away at McAlester State Prison.
Kansas
F3	W of Coffeyville	Montgomery	2305	11 miles (18 km)	3 deaths— A tornado passed just north of downtown Coffeyville, destroying many houses and 13 businesses.
F2	SW of Pomona	Franklin	0000	10 miles (16 km)	A tornado hit downtown Pomona, unroofing six large houses, snapping trees and destroying a railroad depot.
F2	S of Montana to SE of McCune	Labette, Cherokee	0030	10 miles (16 km)	A tornado destroyed barns and unroofed a house.
Sources: Grazulis, Significant, pp. 753–754

=== Mattoon/Charleston, Illinois ===
Mattoon–Charleston, Illinois
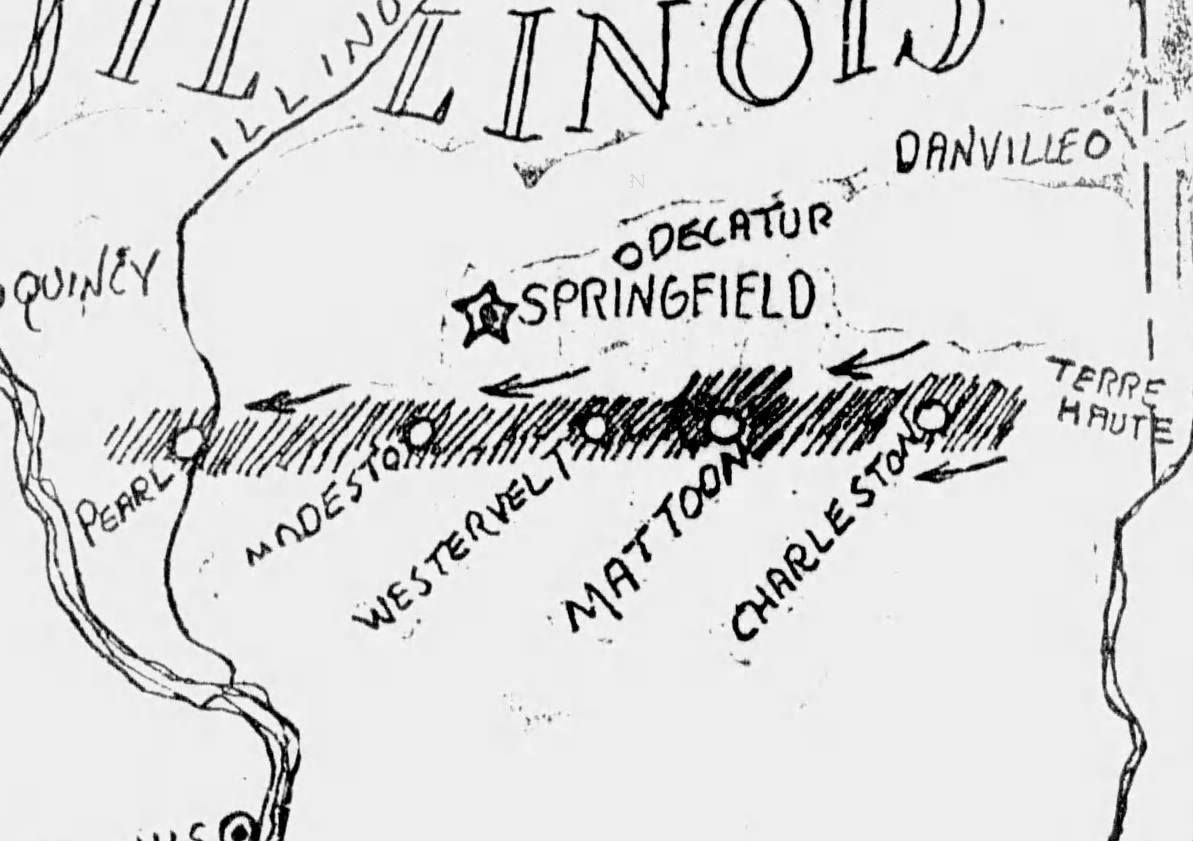
- A map showing the path of the tornado family

Tornado family
- Tornadoes: >4
- Max. rating: F4 tornado

Overall effects
- Casualties: 108 fatalities, 638 injuries

This devastating and long-tracked tornado event first began before noon CST in eastern Missouri, where significant hail was reported, then crossed the Mississippi River into Illinois near Pleasant Hill. These two towns were probably hit by two separate, weak tornadoes which formed from the same thunderstorm, but intense tornado damage only began 2 miles (3.2 km) east of Nebo, Illinois. From there, moving east at about 40 miles per hour (64 km/h), the first violent member of the event moved into White Hall, hitting farms and injuring six people before weakening and dissipating. Another tornado probably developed over Modesto, 22 miles (35 km) to the east. In Modesto, the tornado destroyed 30 homes and damaged 35 others, with three deaths, 16 injuries, and $120,000 damage reported. Over the next 50 miles (80 km), the tornado either weakened or lifted before touching down again at Dunkel, destroying many homes and barns, and continuing into Westervelt. It destroyed 10 homes and killed four people in Westervelt, but much of the damage was due to hail. Rural areas between Dunkel and Westervelt reportedly received severe damage and reported one death.

After hitting Westervelt, the tornado weakened and probably lifted before reforming and re-intensifying over southern Moultrie County. The new tornado then passed directly through the northern half of Mattoon, causing F4 damage and "near-total destruction" in its path. It destroyed 496 homes, damaged 284, and killed at least 53 people in Mattoon; in the hardest-hit areas, few walls were left standing and only small debris remained. Total damage in Mattoon reached $1.2 million. Between Mattoon and Charleston, a distance of 11 miles (18 km), all farms registered damage and often lost buildings. Entering Charleston, the tornado produced less severe damage than in Mattoon, perhaps due to better construction, but at least 220 homes were still destroyed, 265 badly damaged, 38 people killed, and $780,000 damage caused. The tornado then continued beyond Charleston, causing two final deaths at Embarrass before lifting, though weather officials in 1917 believed that the tornado had continued into Indiana.

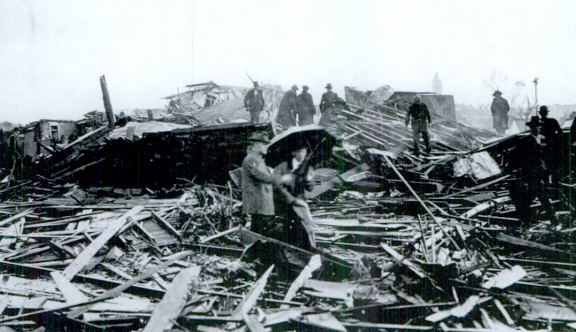
A depot in Charleston, Illinois after the tornado

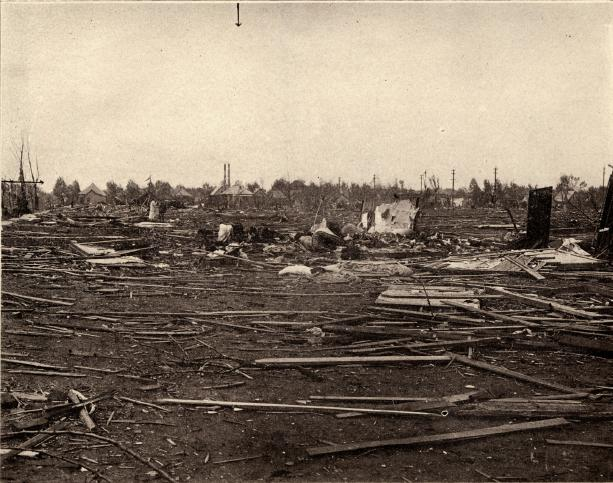
Devastation in Mattoon, Illinois

At one time, this series of tornadoes was considered a single tornado. Lasting seven hours and 40 minutes and covering 293-mile (472 km), it is now generally believed to have been a family of at least four, and possibly eight or more, distinct tornadoes, with either short breaks in the damage path or sections of straight-line wind damage connecting the tornado paths. Debris such as mail, wallpaper, and parts of books was carried 70 miles (110 km) northeast of the parent supercell. In 1917, the tornado was also believed to have produced winds up to 400 miles per hour (640 km/h), though more recent studies have determined that tornadoes only produce winds up to about 300 miles per hour (480 km/h).

== See also ==
- List of North American tornadoes and tornado outbreaks
- List of tornadoes causing 100 or more deaths
