= Tornado outbreak of June 5–6, 1916 =

Weather event in the United States

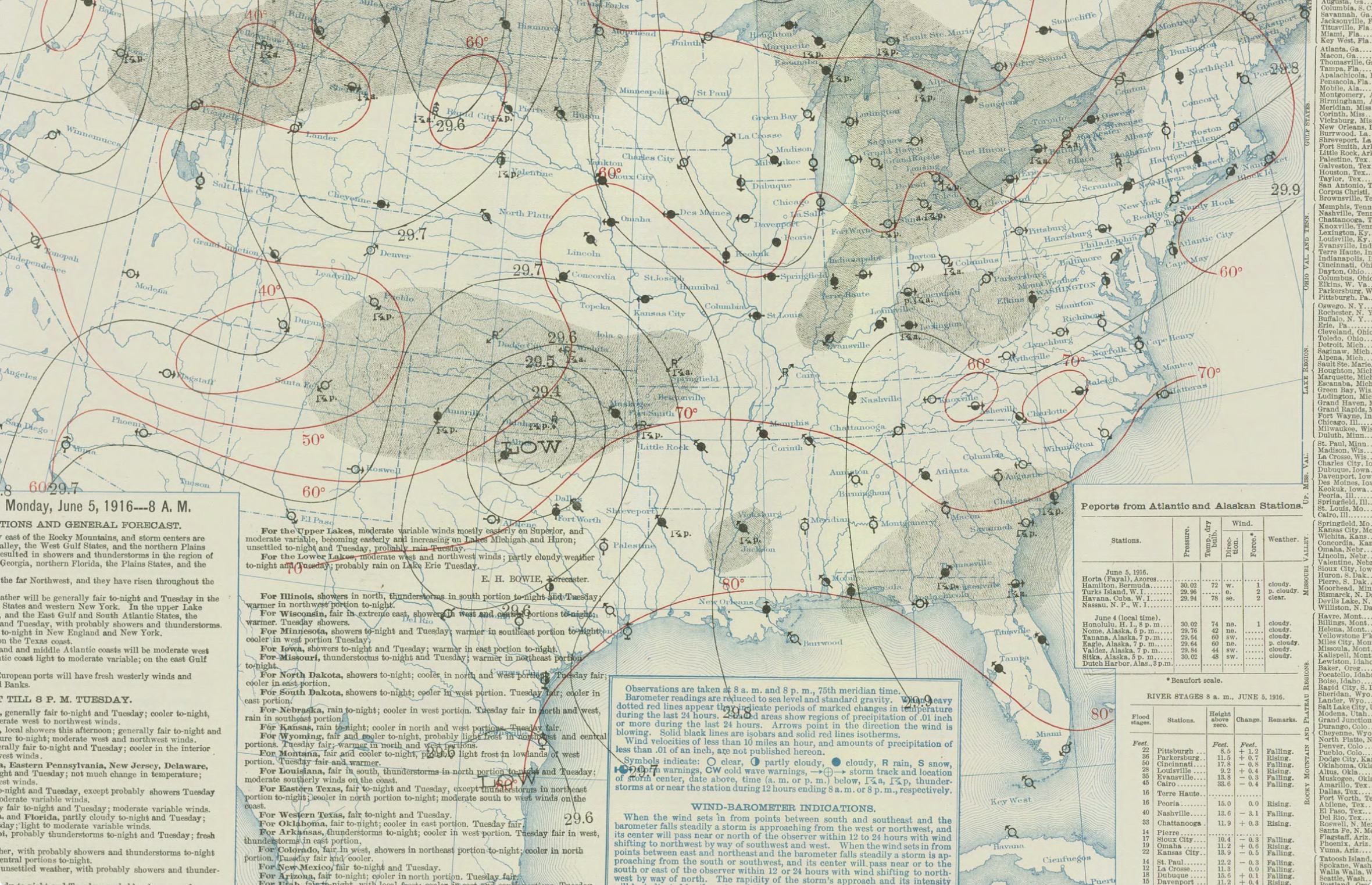
- Weather analysis on June 5

Tornado outbreak
- Tornadoes: ≥ 35
- Max. rating: F4 tornado
- Duration: June 5–6, 1916

Overall effects
- Fatalities: ≥ 143
- Injuries: ≥ 756
- Damage: > $170,000 ($5,030,000 in 2025 USD) (Note: All losses are in 1916 United States dollars unless otherwise noted.)
- Areas affected: Southern United States
- Part of the tornadoes and tornado outbreaks of 1916

On June 5–6, 1916, a deadly severe-weather episode produced at least 35 tornadoes across the Southern United States on June 5–6, 1916. (Note: An outbreak is generally defined as a group of at least six tornadoes (the number sometimes varies slightly according to local climatology) with no more than a six-hour gap between individual tornadoes. An outbreak sequence, prior to (after) the start of modern records in 1950, is defined as a period of no more than two (one) consecutive days without at least one significant (F2 or stronger) tornado.) The outbreak killed at least 143 people, 93 of them in the U.S. state of Arkansas alone. In Missouri tornadoes killed at least 30 people. The deadliest tornado of the outbreak was a powerful F4 that hit Heber Springs on June 5, killing 25 people; tied with it was an F3 that also took 25 lives in and near Judsonia. Overnight tornadoes spread southeast into Louisiana, Tennessee, and Mississippi, with an F3 tornado hitting the northern suburbs of Jackson, Mississippi, killing 13 people there.

== Outbreak statistics ==
Outbreak death toll
State	Total
Alabama	1
Arkansas	93
Illinois	1
Mississippi	17
Missouri	30
Tennessee	1
Totals	143
All deaths were tornado-related

== Confirmed tornadoes ==
Confirmed tornadoes by Fujita rating
FU	F0	F1	F2	F3	F4	F5	Total
?	?	1	20	13	1	0	≥ 35

Prior to 1990, there is a likely undercount of tornadoes, particularly E/F0–1, with reports of weaker tornadoes becoming more common as population increased. A sharp increase in the annual average E/F0–1 count by approximately 200 tornadoes was noted upon the implementation of NEXRAD Doppler weather radar in 1990–1991. (Note: Historically, the number of tornadoes globally and in the United States was and is likely underrepresented: research by Grazulis on annual tornado activity suggests that, as of 2001, only 53% of yearly U.S. tornadoes were officially recorded. Documentation of tornadoes outside the United States was historically less exhaustive, owing to the lack of monitors in many nations and, in some cases, to internal political controls on public information. Most countries only recorded tornadoes that produced severe damage or loss of life. Significant low biases in U.S. tornado counts likely occurred through the early 1990s, when advanced NEXRAD was first installed and the National Weather Service began comprehensively verifying tornado occurrences.) 1974 marked the first year where significant tornado (E/F2+) counts became homogenous with contemporary values, attributed to the consistent implementation of Fujita scale assessments. (Note: The Fujita scale was devised under the aegis of scientist T. Theodore Fujita in the early 1970s. Prior to the advent of the scale in 1971, tornadoes in the United States were officially unrated. Tornado ratings were retroactively applied to events prior to the formal adoption of the F-scale by the National Weather Service. While the Fujita scale has been superseded by the Enhanced Fujita scale in the U.S. since February 1, 2007, Canada used the old scale until April 1, 2013; nations elsewhere, like the United Kingdom, apply other classifications such as the TORRO scale.) Numerous discrepancies on the details of tornadoes in this outbreak exist between sources. The total count of tornadoes and ratings differs from various agencies accordingly. The list below documents information from the most contemporary official sources alongside assessments from tornado historian Thomas P. Grazulis.

=== June 5 event ===
List of confirmed tornadoes – Monday, June 5, 1916
F#	Location	County / Parish	State	Time (UTC) (Note: All dates are based on the local time zone where the tornado touched down; however, all times are in Coordinated Universal Time and dates are split at midnight CST/CDT for consistency.)	Path length	Width (Note: The listed width values are primarily the average/mean width of the tornadoes, with those having known maximum widths denoted by ♯. From 1952 to 1994, reports largely list mean width whereas contemporary years list maximum width. Values provided by Grazulis are the average width, with estimates being rounded down (i.e. 0.5 mi (0.80 km) is rounded down from 880 yards to 800 yards.)	Damage
F2	NNE of Ozark	Franklin	AR	19:30–?	Unknown	400 yd (370 m)	Unknown
F2	1 death – A tornado wrecked three homes, injuring five people.						
F2	Southern Hot Springs	Garland	AR	20:15–?	8 mi (13 km)	200 yd (180 m)	Unknown
F2	4 deaths – A tornado tracked parabolically through town, roughly paralleling an F4 tornado that killed 10 people in the city on November 25, 1915. It damaged 200 houses, one of which it left in front of a train. 20 injuries occurred.						
F2	E of Greenland	Washington	AR	20:30–?	4 mi (6.4 km)	100 yd (91 m)	Unknown
F2	1 death – A tornado hit a small community, damaging or destroying 12 houses. It also struck three plantations and destroyed several tenant houses. 12 people were injured.						
F3	N of Morrilton to Guy	Conway, Faulkner	AR	20:45–?	30 mi (48 km)	400 yd (370 m)	Unknown
F3	2+ deaths – A tornado first tore apart nine homes in the Germantown community. It then destroyed or damaged 20 more structures at Guy. 20 injuries occurred. One person was "blown away" and presumed missing, the New York Times reported.						
F2	Brewer	Cleburne	AR	21:00–?	Unknown	Unknown	Unknown
F2	A tornado struck Brewer, impacting all 47 buildings there. Four people were injured.						
F4	Near Barney to northwestern Heber Springs to S of Almond	Faulkner, Cleburne	AR	22:00–?	35 mi (56 km)	400 yd (370 m)	Unknown
F4	25+ deaths – This tornado family first killed three people between Barney and Beckette Mountain, west of Rose Bud. It then destroyed 50 houses in Heber Springs, "dozens" of which it leveled, claiming 18 or more lives there, per tornado expert Thomas P. Grazulis, and left in ruins the western side of town. Afterward, it flattened another house near Banner, killing four people inside. Papers from Beckette Mountain traveled 55 mi (89 km). 150 injuries occurred, and of those killed, two thirds were children.						
F2	SE of Melbourne to Sage	Izard	AR	22:00–?	5 mi (8.0 km)	Unknown	Unknown
F2	A tornado destroyed many barns, injuring a few people.						
F3	E of Dalark to N of Carthage	Dallas	AR	23:00–?	15 mi (24 km)	800 yd (730 m)	Unknown
F3	5 deaths – A tornado first flattened a small house, killing five family members inside, before inflicting minor damage at Carthage. Three injuries occurred.						
F2	E of Cato	Pulaski	AR	23:00–?	2 mi (3.2 km)	100 yd (91 m)	Unknown
F2	A tornado hit a pair of farms, destroying three homes and injuring five people.						
F2	Western Little Rock	Pulaski	AR	23:00–?	1 mi (1.6 km)	200 yd (180 m)	Unknown
F2	This tornado unroofed homes in the Pulaski Heights neighborhood.						
F2	S of Cabot	Lonoke	AR	23:15–?	10 mi (16 km)	200 yd (180 m)	Unknown
F2	3+ deaths – A tornado ripped apart a home, killing its two occupants. 22 people were injured, a few of whom may have died weeks later, and a third death was reported.						
F2	Alvis	Independence	AR	23:30–?	1 mi (1.6 km)	Unknown	Unknown
F2	This tornado destroyed many barns and a few homes, injuring a person.						
F3	Between Kensett and Judsonia to near Bald Knob	White	AR	23:30–?	4 mi (6.4 km)	300 yd (270 m)	Unknown
F3	25 deaths – An intense tornado destroyed a third of Judsonia, striking the eastern side of town. At least 50 injuries occurred, and a family lost five of its members. Grazulis indicated nine deaths and 35 injuries, but press totals were much higher.						
F2	Near Sweet Home to Kerr	Pulaski, Lonoke	AR	23:30–?	15 mi (24 km)	Unknown	Unknown
F2	1 death – A tornado hit half a dozen farms, destroying houses and other structures. It passed through the Galloway–Baucum area. Five injuries occurred.						
F2	Near McMullin and Vanduser	Scott	MO	23:30–?	Unknown	Unknown	Unknown
F2	Visible from a train, this tornado destroyed small houses, barns, and a nearby school. Three injuries occurred.						
F2	Unknown	Sharp	AR	23:45–?	5 mi (8.0 km)	Unknown	Unknown
F2	A tornado wrecked barns and houses on six farms, injuring three people.						
F2	NW of Stuttgart	Arkansas	AR	00:00–?	Unknown	Unknown	Unknown
F2	A tornado destroyed barns.						
F2	NW of Slovak to S of Hazen to near DeValls Bluff	Prairie	AR	00:00–?	10 mi (16 km)	300 yd (270 m)	Unknown
F2	4 deaths – A tornado hit tenant homes, injuring 42 people, including 15 near Slovak.						
F3	N of Tuckerman	Jackson	AR	00:30–?	10 mi (16 km)	100 yd (91 m)	Unknown
F3	4 deaths – An intense tornado obliterated tenant homes, moving bodies up to 1/4 mi (0.40 km) away, killing three family members, and injuring 40 people.						
F3	NW of Brinkley	Monroe	AR	00:30–?	2 mi (3.2 km)	100 yd (91 m)	Unknown
F3	1 death – A tornado wrecked a cotton gin and eight small homes, carrying the dead 1/2 mi (0.80 km), along with his house. 10 injuries occurred.						
F3	SE of Vallier	Arkansas	AR	01:00–?	5 mi (8.0 km)	Unknown	Unknown
F3	2 deaths – This tornado hit two plantations, causing separate deaths. Eight injuries occurred.						
F3	Stoddard to W of Bloomfield	Stoddard	MO	01:30–?	7 mi (11 km)	Unknown	Unknown
F3	8 deaths – A tornado destroyed homes, causing deaths in five families. 20 injuries occurred.						
F2	W of Imboden (AR) to near Flatwoods (MO)	Lawrence (AR), Randolph (AR), Ripley (MO)	AR, MO	01:30–?	45 mi (72 km)	Unknown	Unknown
F2	1 death – A tornado family hit a farmhouse, claiming a life, and wrecked buildings in Arkansas, before causing sporadic damage in Missouri, where it destroyed barns near Poynor (then Poynter). 10 injuries occurred.						
F1	N of Vanndale to Weona Junction	Cross, Poinsett	AR	02:00–?	20 mi (32 km)	300 yd (270 m)	Unknown
F1	2 deaths – A tornado blew a tree onto a boarding house, killing two women and injuring 13 other people inside. Four additional injuries occurred elsewhere.						
F3	N of Rector to between St. Francis and Pollard	Clay	AR	02:00–?	9 mi (14 km)	100 yd (91 m)	Unknown
F3	7 deaths – A tornado destroyed small houses, causing deaths in three of them; four children lost their lives. 25 injuries occurred.						
F2	S of Dubberly	Webster	LA	02:00–?	Unknown	Unknown	Unknown
F2	A tornado wrecked small houses, injuring five people.						
F3	SW of Haynes to SE of Forrest City	Lee, St. Francis	AR	02:00–?	11 mi (18 km)	Unknown	Unknown
F3	4 deaths – A tornado wrecked 16 tenant homes on three large farms, causing deaths on one of them. 40 injuries occurred.						
F3	SSW of Morehouse to near Big Ridge	Stoddard, New Madrid, Scott	MO	03:30–?	≥ 8 mi (13 km)	Unknown	Unknown
F3	7 deaths – A tornado obliterated three houses, killing six people in one of them, while ripping apart 15 barns and seven more houses; a seventh person died weeks later. 17 injuries occurred. The tornado may have continued to Kelso.						
F3	W of Miner (MO) to Blodgett (MO) to Fayville (IL)	Scott (MO), Alexander (IL)	MO, IL	04:00–?	30 mi (48 km)	200 yd (180 m)	Unknown
F3	5 deaths – A tornado destroyed much of Blodgett, injuring five people there, along with 11 houses at Fayville, where it injured 20 people and killed a girl. Four other deaths—a few by airborne debris, two more in houses—occurred elsewhere, along with many rural injuries. In all 60 injuries occurred.						
F2	N of Marion (AR) to SW of Munford (TN)	Critttenden (AR), Tipton (TN)	AR, TN	04:00–?	25 mi (40 km)	300 yd (270 m)	Unknown
F2	2+ deaths – A tornado destroyed at least 20 houses in Missouri, along with a barn and house in Tennessee, causing a death in each state. At least 63 injuries were tornado-related. Stormy weather, dubbed an "electric tornado", on the Mississippi River snapped 20-inch-diameter (1.7 ft; 0.51 m) trees and caused the packet boat Eleonore to capsize, drowning 19–34 people, but could not be definitively attributed to the tornado.						

=== June 6 event ===
List of confirmed tornadoes – Tuesday, June 6, 1916
F#	Location	County / Parish	State	Time (UTC)	Path length	Width	Damage
F3	S of Yokena	Warren	MS	05:30–?	10 mi (16 km)	250 yd (230 m)	$20,000
F3	4 deaths – A tornado leveled tenant houses, moving bodies 1/2 mi (0.80 km) and injuring 25 people.						
F2	Oak Grove	West Carroll	LA	05:45–?	Unknown	50 yd (46 m)	Unknown
F2	A tornado destroyed two houses, a Masonic lodge, and a Methodist church, injuring five people.						
F3	Northwestern Jackson	Hinds, Madison	MS	07:10–?	15 mi (24 km)	100 yd (91 m)	$150,000
F3	13 deaths – This tornado damaged or destroyed approximately 250 houses, of which it leveled smaller ones, while tearing roofs and chimneys from larger, better-built buildings. 56 injuries occurred.						
F2	Near Pineville	Smith	MS	09:30–?	2 mi (3.2 km)	50 yd (46 m)	Unknown
F2	A narrow, brief tornado wrecked rural barns and homes, injuring three people.						
F2	Taylors Ferry	Jefferson	AL	17:00–?	7.5 mi (12.1 km)	200 yd (180 m)	Unknown
F2	A tornado demolished four homes, injuring five people.						

== See also ==
- List of North American tornadoes and tornado outbreaks
- Tornado outbreak of March 21–22, 1952 – Generated many long-lived, violent tornadoes in the same area, including a deadly F4 that killed 30 people around Judsonia
- Tornado outbreak of January 21–23, 1999 – Produced more tornadoes in Arkansas than any other outbreak

== Sources ==
- Agee, Ernest M.; Childs, Samuel (June 1, 2014). "Adjustments in Tornado Counts, F-Scale Intensity, and Path Width for Assessing Significant Tornado Destruction". Journal of Applied Meteorology and Climatology. 53 (6). American Meteorological Society: 1494–1505. Bibcode:2014JApMC..53.1494A. doi:10.1175/JAMC-D-13-0235.1.
- Brooks, Harold E. (April 2004). "On the Relationship of Tornado Path Length and Width to Intensity". Weather and Forecasting. 19 (2): 310–19. Bibcode:2004WtFor..19..310B. doi:10.1175/1520-0434(2004)019<0310:OTROTP>2.0.CO;2.
- Cook, A. R.; Schaefer, J. T. (August 2008). "The Relation of El Niño–Southern Oscillation (ENSO) to Winter Tornado Outbreaks". Monthly Weather Review. 136 (8): 3121–3137. Bibcode:2008MWRv..136.3121C. doi:10.1175/2007MWR2171.1.
- Edwards, Roger; LaDue, James G.; Ferree, John T.; Scharfenberg, Kevin; Maier, Chris; Coulbourne, William L. (May 1, 2013). "Tornado Intensity Estimation: Past, Present, and Future". Bulletin of the American Meteorological Society. 94 (5). American Meteorological Society: 641–653. Bibcode:2013BAMS...94..641E. doi:10.1175/BAMS-D-11-00006.1.
- Grazulis, Thomas P. (May 1984). Violent Tornado Climatography, 1880–1982. OSTI (Technical report). NUREG. Washington, D.C.: Nuclear Regulatory Commission. OSTI 7099491. CR-3670.
  - — (November 1990). Significant Tornadoes 1880–1989. Vol. 2. St. Johnsbury, Vermont: The Tornado Project of Environmental Films. ISBN 1-879362-02-3.
  - — (July 1993). Significant Tornadoes 1680–1991: A Chronology and Analysis of Events. St. Johnsbury, Vermont: The Tornado Project of Environmental Films. ISBN 1-879362-03-1.
  - — (2001a). The Tornado: Nature's Ultimate Windstorm. Norman: University of Oklahoma Press. ISBN 978-0-8061-3538-0.
  - — (2001b). F5-F6 Tornadoes. St. Johnsbury, Vermont: The Tornado Project of Environmental Films.
