= List of disasters in Arkansas by death toll =

This list of disasters in Arkansas by death toll includes major disasters (excluding acts of war) that occurred in the U.S. state of Arkansas.

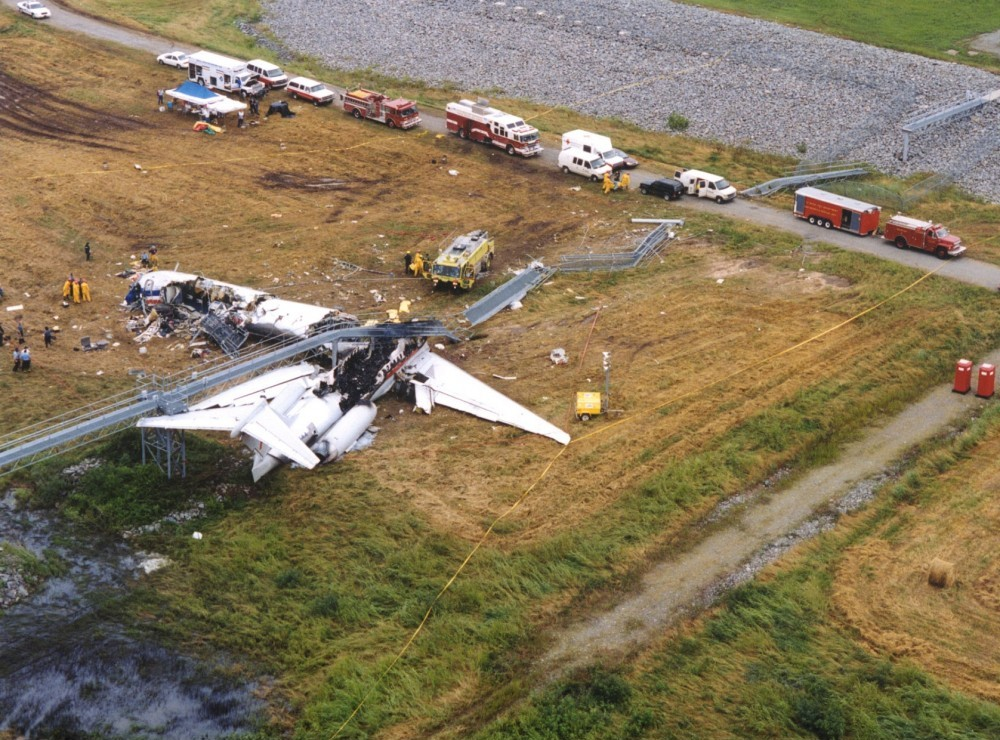
Wreckage of American Airlines Flight 1420 which crashed at Little Rock National Airport in 1999.

== 100 or more deaths ==
Fatalities	Year	Article	Type	Location	Comments
1,547-1,864	1865	Sultana disaster	Steamboat disaster	Marion	Deadliest maritime disaster in American history
127 (Arkansas)	1927	Great Mississippi Flood of 1927	Flood	East Arkansas	
111 (Arkansas)	1952	Tornado outbreak of March 21–22, 1952	Tornado outbreak	Statewide	

== 50 to 99 deaths ==
Fatalities	Year	Article	Type	Location	Comments
93 (Arkansas)	1916	Tornado outbreak of June 5–6, 1916	Tornado outbreak	North-central Arkansas	
75	1865	Niagara collides with Post Boy	Ship collision	Prairie Point, Phillips County	
75	1857	Rainbow disaster	Ship fire	Victoria Bend, Desha County	
70 (Arkansas)	1927	Tornado outbreak of May 7–9, 1927	Tornado outbreak	Statewide	
69-155	1832	Brandywine disaster	Steamboat disaster	Brandywine Island	
60	1859	St. Nicholas explosion	Steamboat disaster	Helena	
55-60	1838	General Brown disaster	Steamboat disaster	Helena	
55	1949	1949 Warren tornado	Tornado	Bradley County	
55	1898	1898 Fort Smith, Arkansas, tornado	Tornado	Fort Smith	
53	1965	1965 Searcy missile silo fire	Structure fire	Searcy	
51	1921	1921 Miller-Hempstead tornados	Tornado family	Miller and Hempstead counties	
50-60	1867	David White (steamboat)	Steamboat disaster	Point Chicot	
50	1952	1952 Judsonia tornado	Tornado	White County	Part of the Tornado outbreak of March 21–22, 1952.

== 10 to 49 deaths ==
Fatalities	Year	Article	Type	Location	Comments
49	1909	Brinkley tornado	Tornado	Brinkley	
45-60	1854	Caroline disaster	Ship fire	White River	
45 (Arkansas)	1968	Tornado outbreak of May 15–16, 1968	Tornado outbreak	Statewide	
40-200	1865	Miami disaster	Steamboat	Napoleon, Desha County	
40	1862	Sinking of the Acacia	Shipwreck	Grand Cut Off	
40	1845	Caspian disaster	Shipwreck	Tomato	
39	1870	Nick Wall disaster	Shipwreck	near Grand Lake, Chicot County	
35	1968	1968 Jonesboro tornado	Tornado	Jackson, Craighead, and Mississippi counties	Part of the Tornado outbreak of May 15–16, 1968
34	1841	Caroloina disaster	Shipwreck	Mississippi River in Osceola	
29-50	1882	Paragon Saloon disaster	Building collapse	Texarkana	
29-40	1952	1952 Cotton Plant-Hunter tornado	Tornado	Woodruff County	Part of the Tornado outbreak of March 21–22, 1952.
27	1939	Center Point tornado	Tornado	Center Point, Drew County	
25+	1916	Barney-Heber Springs tornado	Tornado	Faulkner and Cleburne counties	Part of the Tornado outbreak of June 5–6, 1916.
25 (Arkansas)	1997	March 1997 tornado outbreak	Tornado outbreak	Statewide	
25	1916	1916 Judsonia tornado	Tornado	White County	Part of the Tornado outbreak of June 5–6, 1916
25	1840	Persian disaster	Steamboat disaster	Napoleon	
24	1927	1927 Strong tornado	Tornado	Strong	Part of the Tornado outbreak of May 7–9, 1927
23	1929	Sneed Tornado	Tornado	Sneed	
22+	1861	Kentucky disaster	Steamboat disaster	Mississippi River near Helena	
21-41	1848	Clarksville fire	Ship fire	Island No. 75 (near Napoleon)	
21-30	1828	Car of Commerce disaster	Steamboat disaster	Canadian Reach near Tomato	
21	1959	Arkansas Negro Boys' Industrial School fire	Structure fire	Wrightsville	
20-23	1851	Sinking of the Clermont	Shipwreck	near Augusta	
20	2010	Albert Pike flash flood	Flash Flood	southern Montgomery County	
20	1980	1980 Jasper bus crash	Bus crash	Jasper	
20	1865	Sinking of Progress	Shipwreck	Fort Smith	
20	1850	St. Joseph disaster	Steamboat disaster	near Napoleon	
18-21	1851	Oregon disaster	Steamboat disaster	Mississippi River near Island No. 82	
17	1936	American Airlines Flight 1 (1936)	Plane crash	near Goodwin	
17	1869	G.A. Thomson fire	Ship fire	near Little Rock	
17	1836	Rob Roy disaster	Steamboat disaster	Columbia, Chicot County	
16-17	1840	Cherokee explosion	Steamboat disaster	Lewisburg	
16	2014	2014 Mayflower–Vilonia tornado	Tornado	Northwest Arkansas	
15-30	1873	George C. Wolfe disaster	Steamboat disaster	St. Francis Island, Mississippi River	
15	2004	Turrell bus crash	Bus crash	Turrell	
15	1997	1997 North Little Rock tornado	Tornado	Saline and Pulaski counties	Part of the March 1997 tornado outbreak
14	1945	1945 Rich Mountain US Navy plane crash	Plane crash	Rich Mountain	
14	1897	Kansas & Texas No. 44 Coal Mine disaster	Mining disaster	Huntington	
13	2008	2008 Atkins–Clinton tornado	Tornado	Central and Northern Arkansas	
13	1999	Miss Majestic sinking	Duckboat disaster	Lake Hamilton	
13	1954	Parkin tent fire	Structure fire	Parkin	
13	1928	Mama No.3 Coal Mine disaster	Mining disaster	Jenny Lind	
12-18	1847	New Hampshire explosion	Steamboat disaster	Arkansas River in Pine Bluff	
12	1852	Mary Queen disaster	Steamboat disaster	Little Rock	
12	1927	1927 Egypt-Lanieve tornado	Tornado	Egypt to Pauls Switch	Part of the Tornado outbreak of May 7–9, 1927
11-15	1857	Forest Rose explosion	Steamboat disaster	Arkansas River	
11-14	1908	Miriam disaster	Shipwreck	Hardin's Point, Mississippi River	
11	1999	American Airlines Flight 1420	Plane crash	Little Rock	
11	1973	Texas International Airlines Flight 655	Plane crash	Black Fork Mountain	
11	1927	Hoxie-Walnut Ridge tornado	Tornado	Lawrence County	Part of the Tornado outbreak of May 7–9, 1927
11	1903	Bonanza No. 20 Coal Mine explosion	Mining disaster	Bonanza	
10-23	1916	1916 White & Arkansas river floods	Floods	White & Arkansas rivers	
10-11	1852	Pocahontas fire	Ship fire	Choctaw Bend	
10	1971	1971 Little Rock AFB crash	Plane crash	Little Rock AFB	
10	1940	Bates No.2 Coal Mine explosion	Mining disaster	Bates	
10	1839	Wilmington disaster	Steamboat disaster	Arkansas River	
10	1854	Sinking of General Bem	Shipwreck	Walnut Bend	
