= Bird Hill =

American summit in Scott County

Coordinates: 37.0900506°N 89.7678659°W

Bird Hill is a summit in Scott County in the U.S. state of Missouri with an elevation of 466 feet (142 m).

Bird Hill has the name of Stephen Bird, an early settler.
