= Sals Creek =

Stream in Scott County, Missouri, U.S.

Coordinates: 37.213662°N 89.560923°W

Sals Creek is a stream in Scott County in the U.S. state of Missouri.

Sals Creek, originally called Salls Creek, has the name of the local Salls family.

== See also ==
- List of rivers of Missouri
