= Rock View =

Rock View or Rockview may refer to:

- Rockview, Michigan, an unincorporated community
- Rockview, Missouri, an unincorporated community in Scott County
- Rock View, West Virginia, an unincorporated community in Wyoming County
