= Diehlstadt, Missouri =

- Village
- Location of Diehlstadt, Missouri
- Coordinates: 36°57′30″N 89°25′51″W
- Country: United States
- State: Missouri
- County: Scott

Government
  - Type: Mayoral
  - Mayor: Rodney Seiler

Area
  - Total: 0.073 sq mi (0.19 km^{2})
  - Land: 0.073 sq mi (0.19 km^{2})
  - Water: 0 sq mi (0.00 km^{2})
- Elevation: 325 ft (99 m)

Population (2020)
  - Total: 157
  - Density: 2,115.1/sq mi (816.66/km^{2})
- Time zone: UTC-6 (Central (CST))
  - Summer (DST): UTC-5 (CDT)
- FIPS code: 29-19486
- GNIS feature ID: 0716891

Diehlstadt (/ˈdiːlstæt/ DEEL-stat) is a village in Scott County, Missouri, United States. As of the 2020 census, Diehlstadt had a population of 157. Diehlstadt was founded by John Kirkpatrick.

== History ==
Diehlstadt was platted in 1868. The original plat of Diehlstadt filed on June 15, 1870, consisted of 40 acres. The community of Diehlstadt was founded by Tennessee-born John Kirkpatrick (1829-1903) who was one of the community's first merchants and served as Diehlstadt's postmaster between May 11, 1876, and July 30, 1890. The community was named after one H. J. Deal (also spelled Diehl), a German merchant, with the German-language suffix "stadt" meaning town. A post office called Diehlstadt was established in 1870, and remained in operation until 1977.

== Geography ==
The village is in southeast Scott County, approximately six miles southeast of the Mississippi River and nine miles northeast of Sikeston. It is located on Missouri Route 77, 2.5 miles north of U.S. Route 62.

According to the United States Census Bureau, the village has a total area of 0.07 square miles (0.18 km^{2}), all land.

== Demographics ==
Historical population
Census	Pop.	Note	%±
1900	156		—
1910	160		2.6%
1920	196		22.5%
1930	163		−16.8%
1940	159		−2.5%
1950	165		3.8%
1960	141		−14.5%
1970	155		9.9%
1980	170		9.7%
1990	145		−14.7%
2000	163		12.4%
2010	161		−1.2%
2020	157		−2.5%
U.S. Decennial Census

=== 2010 census ===
As of the census of 2010, there were 161 people, 56 households, and 50 families living in the village. The population density was 2,300.0 inhabitants per square mile (888.0/km^{2}). There were 63 housing units at an average density of 900.0 per square mile (347.5/km^{2}). The racial makeup of the village was 98.76% White and 1.24% from two or more races.

There were 56 households, of which 42.9% had children under the age of 18 living with them, 71.4% were married couples living together, 12.5% had a female householder with no husband present, 5.4% had a male householder with no wife present, and 10.7% were non-families. 8.9% of all households were made up of individuals, and 3.6% had someone living alone who was 65 years of age or older. The average household size was 2.88 and the average family size was 3.00.

The median age in the village was 36.5 years. 26.1% of residents were under the age of 18; 11.8% were between the ages of 18 and 24; 21.2% were from 25 to 44; 27.4% were from 45 to 64; and 13.7% were 65 years of age or older. The gender makeup of the village was 47.8% male and 52.2% female.

=== 2000 census ===
As of the census of 2000, there were 163 people, 61 households, and 48 families living in the village. The population density was 2,149.4 inhabitants per square mile (829.9/km^{2}). There were 62 housing units at an average density of 817.6 per square mile (315.7/km^{2}). The racial makeup of the village was 99.39% White and 0.61% Asian. Hispanic or Latino of any race were 2.45% of the population.

There were 61 households, out of which 37.7% had children under the age of 18 living with them, 62.3% were married couples living together, 9.8% had a female householder with no husband present, and 21.3% were non-families. 19.7% of all households were made up of individuals, and 11.5% had someone living alone who was 65 years of age or older. The average household size was 2.67 and the average family size was 2.98.

In the village, the population was spread out, with 28.8% under the age of 18, 8.6% from 18 to 24, 30.1% from 25 to 44, 22.1% from 45 to 64, and 10.4% who were 65 years of age or older. The median age was 36 years. For every 100 females, there were 94.0 males. For every 100 females age 18 and over, there were 93.3 males.

The median income for a household in the village was $24,375, and the median income for a family was $26,667. Males had a median income of $26,250 versus $17,917 for females. The per capita income for the village was $15,164. About 8.3% of families and 13.9% of the population were below the poverty line, including 5.1% of those under the age of 18 and 55.6% of those 65 or over.

== Education ==
It is in the Scott County R-IV School District.

Prior to 1954, the community had its own school district. That year, it consolidated into Scott County R-IV.

Three Rivers College's service area includes Scott County.

=== Historic area public schools ===
- Dunaver School (c.1912 – c.1952) was located in old Tywappity Township.
- Mounds School (c.1911 – c.1921) was located at the corner of State Highway O and Scott County Highway 530, absorbed by Diehlstadt in 1922.
