= Lambert, Missouri =

- Inactive Village
- Location of Lambert, Missouri
- Coordinates: 37°5′42″N 89°33′11″W
- Country: United States
- State: Missouri
- County: Scott

Area
  - Total: 0.050 sq mi (0.13 km^{2})
  - Land: 0.050 sq mi (0.13 km^{2})
  - Water: 0 sq mi (0.00 km^{2})
- Elevation: 338 ft (103 m)

Population (2020)
  - Total: 48
  - Density: 934.4/sq mi (360.77/km^{2})
- Time zone: UTC-6 (Central (CST))
  - Summer (DST): UTC-5 (CDT)
- ZIP code: 63736
- Area code: 573
- FIPS code: 29-40448
- GNIS feature ID: 0730412

Lambert is an inactive village in Scott County, Missouri, United States. The population was 48 at the 2020 census.

The community has the name of W. C. Lambert, a local judge.

== Geography ==
Lambert is located at 37°5′42″N 89°33′11″W (37.095043, -89.553170).

According to the United States Census Bureau, the village has a total area of 0.05 square miles (0.13 km^{2}), all land.

== Demographics ==
Historical population
Census	Pop.	Note	%±
1920	43		—
1930	46		7.0%
1940	32		−30.4%
1950	39		21.9%
1960	43		10.3%
1970	39		−9.3%
1980	34		−12.8%
1990	36		5.9%
2000	49		36.1%
2010	34		−30.6%
2020	48		41.2%
U.S. Decennial Census

=== 2010 census ===
As of the census of 2010, there were 34 people, 16 households, and 12 families living in the village. The population density was 680.0 inhabitants per square mile (262.5/km^{2}). There were 19 housing units at an average density of 380.0 per square mile (146.7/km^{2}). The racial makeup of the village was 100.00% White.

There were 16 households, of which 18.8% had children under the age of 18 living with them, 56.3% were married couples living together, 12.5% had a female householder with no husband present, 6.3% had a male householder with no wife present, and 25.0% were non-families. 18.8% of all households were made up of individuals, and 6.3% had someone living alone who was 65 years of age or older. The average household size was 2.13 and the average family size was 2.42.

The median age in the village was 54 years. 14.7% of residents were under the age of 18; 5.8% were between the ages of 18 and 24; 11.8% were from 25 to 44; 35.3% were from 45 to 64; and 32.4% were 65 years of age or older. The gender makeup of the village was 50.0% male and 50.0% female.

=== 2000 census ===
As of the census of 2000, there were 49 people, 17 households, and 13 families living in the village. The population density was 942.2 inhabitants per square mile (363.8/km^{2}). There were 17 housing units at an average density of 326.9 per square mile (126.2/km^{2}). The racial makeup of the village was 95.92% White, and 4.08% from two or more races.

There were 17 households, out of which 29.4% had children under the age of 18 living with them, 76.5% were married couples living together, and 23.5% were non-families. 11.8% of all households were made up of individuals, and 5.9% had someone living alone who was 65 years of age or older. The average household size was 2.88 and the average family size was 3.31.

In the village, the population was spread out, with 22.4% under the age of 18, 4.1% from 18 to 24, 34.7% from 25 to 44, 24.5% from 45 to 64, and 14.3% who were 65 years of age or older. The median age was 36 years. For every 100 females, there were 96.0 males. For every 100 females age 18 and over, there were 100.0 males.

The median income for a household in the village was $34,375, and the median income for a family was $43,125. Males had a median income of $24,375 versus $13,125 for females. The per capita income for the village was $16,533. There were no families and 6.1% of the population living below the poverty line, including no under eighteens and none of those over 64.

== Education ==
It is in the Scott County R-IV School District.

Three Rivers College's service area includes Scott County.
