= Bleda, Missouri =

Unincorporated community in Missouri, U.S.

Coordinates: 37°04′14″N 89°38′15″W

Bleda is an unincorporated community in Scott County, in the U.S. state of Missouri.

== History ==
Bleda was originally called "Caney Creek", and under the latter name was founded in 1873. A post office called Bleda was established in 1892, and remained in operation until 1916. The present name is a transfer from Blida, Algeria.

The Bleda school district consolidated into Oran R-III School District in 1955.
