= Kagel, Missouri =

Unincorporated community in Missouri, U.S.

Coordinates: 37°12′21″N 89°38′00″W

Kagel is an unincorporated community in Scott County, in the U.S. state of Missouri.

The community has the name of the Kagel family, proprietors of a local sawmill.
