= Tywappity Township, Scott County, Missouri =

Township in Scott County, Missouri, U.S.

Coordinates: 37.0044°N 89.4033°W

Tywappity Township is an inactive township in Scott County, in the U.S. state of Missouri.

Tywappity Township was erected in 1822. "Tywappity" is a name possibly derived from the Shawnee language.
