= Parker, Missouri =

Unincorporated community in Missouri, U.S.

Coordinates: 37°03′52″N 89°40′17″W

Parker is an unincorporated community in Scott County, in the U.S. state of Missouri.

== History ==
A post office called "Parkers Station" was established in 1875, and remained in operation until 1883. The community has the name of the Parker family, proprietor of a local sawmill.
