= Perkins, Missouri =

- Census-Designated Place
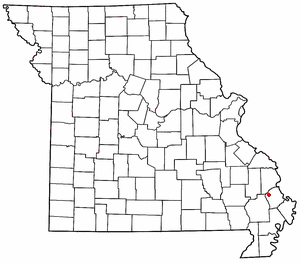
- Location of Perkins in Missouri
- Coordinates: 37°05′41″N 89°46′31″W
- Country: United States
- State: Missouri
- County: Scott

Area
  - Total: 0.17 sq mi (0.43 km^{2})
  - Land: 0.17 sq mi (0.43 km^{2})
  - Water: 0 sq mi (0.00 km^{2})
- Elevation: 338 ft (103 m)

Population (2020)
  - Total: 123
  - Density: 745.2/sq mi (287.73/km^{2})
- ZIP code: 63771
- Area code: 573
- FIPS code: 29-57044
- GNIS feature ID: 724226

Perkins is an unincorporated community and census-designated place in western Scott County, Missouri, United States. It is located sixteen miles northwest of Sikeston.

A post office called Perkins has been in operation since 1890. The community has the name of Amos Perkins, a businessperson in the local lumber industry.

Perkins is found in the St. Louis Southwestern Railway Northern Division Employee Time Table No. 10 dated August 18, 1935. Perkins was station I-24 at milepost 23.76. It had a 20 car siding. In 1935 terms that was 900 feet long, as the then standard car was 45 feet in length. There was a mail crane at Perkins. It was a flagstop for passenger trains #5 and #6. Nearby Randles had a day/night telegraph and long lap sidings to meet trains.

== Demographics ==
Historical population
Census	Pop.	Note	%±
2020	123		—
U.S. Decennial Census

Perkins first appeared as a census designated place in the 2020 U.S. census.

== Education ==
It is in the Oran R-III School District.

Three Rivers College's service area includes Scott County.
