= Scott County R-IV School District =

School district in Missouri, U.S.

Scott County R-IV School District is a school district headquartered in unincorporated Scott County, Missouri, with a Benton post office address. The schools in the district are Scott County Elementary School, Scott County Middle School, and Thomas W. Kelly High School.

Communities in the district include Benton, Blodgett, Commerce, Diehlstadt, and Lambert. A small piece of Miner extends into the district boundary. It also includes the unincorporated area of Lusk. The district is mostly in Scott County, with a portion extending into Mississippi County.

== History ==
Scott County Reorganized School District R-4 was created in March 1954 by the consolidation of three high school districts and eight elementary school districts. In regards to the vote to create the district 520 were in favor and 385 were against as of an unofficial count on March 4, 1954. At the time the count in the Dunnover district was not yet reported. The Enterprise-Courier of Charleston, Missouri characterized Benton as providing a significant number of "yes" votes.

In 1955 there was an attempt to consolidate this district and the Scott County Central School District (R-5), but this was voted down.

Initially the district had an elementary and a high school in Benton, an elementary and a high school in Blodgett, and a high school in Diehlstadt. A consolidated high school, Kelly High was scheduled to open on August 29, 1957. It was named after a man from Benton who died as a soldier in World War II. The district planned to, as a result, close the elementary schools in Benton and Blodgett and convert the Benton, Blodgett, and Diehlstadt high schools into elementary schools.

In 2021, Bradley Kolwyck became the superintendent.
