= Lusk, Missouri =

Unincorporated community in Missouri, U.S.

Coordinates: 37°01′56″N 89°22′54″W

Lusk is an unincorporated community in Scott County, in the U.S. state of Missouri.

== History ==
Lusk once had a schoolhouse and a chapel, now defunct. The schoolhouse and chapel were named after William M. Lusk, a local preacher.

Prior to 1954, the community had its own school district. That year, it consolidated into Scott County R-IV School District.
