= Zewapeta, Missouri =

Unincorporated community in Missouri, U.S.

Coordinates: 37°10′10″N 89°27′33″W

Zewapeta is an unincorporated community in Scott County, in the U.S. state of Missouri.

Zewapeta most likely is a Native American name of unknown meaning. It is speculated to be a Shawnee-language name.
