= Oran R-III School District =

School district in Missouri, U.S.

Oran R-III School District is a school district headquartered in Oran, Missouri. Located in Scott County, its boundary includes Oran and Perkins.

Voters in a special election on September 27, 1955, created the district. There had been two previous failed attempts to form Oran-RIII. The districts consolidated included those of Bleda, Bryeans, Hooe, Oran, and Perkins.

In 1960, voters in a referendum confirmed a bond to have a new elementary school built.
