= Crowder, Missouri =

Unincorporated community in Missouri, U.S.

Coordinates: 36.9625°N 89.68333°W

Crowder is a place in Scott County, Missouri, United States. The town site is located on State Highway Z between Tanner and Vanduser.

Crowder got its start in the 1890s when the railroad was extended to that point. The community was named after James H. Crowder, a railroad official. Crowder was incorporated as a town in 1902. A post office called Crowder was established in 1898, and remained in operation until 1957. Crowder contained a schoolhouse from roughly 1901 until 1950.
