= Sargent, Scott County, Missouri =

Unincorporated community in Missouri, U.S.

Coordinates: 36°54′03″N 89°30′21″W

Sargent is an unincorporated community in Scott County, in the U.S. state of Missouri.

The community has the name of the Sargent family, proprietors of a 19th-century sawmill.
