= Salcedo, Missouri =

Unincorporated community in Missouri, U.S.

Coordinates: 36°53′20″N 89°41′00″W

Salcedo is an unincorporated community in Scott County, in the U.S. state of Missouri.

Salcedo was founded in the 1890s, and named after Juan Manuel de Salcedo, a Spanish colonial politician.
