= Porter, Missouri =

Unincorporated community in Missouri, US

Coordinates: 36°58′49″N 89°28′39″W

Porter is an unincorporated community in Scott County, in the U.S. state of Missouri.

Porter was founded in the early 20th century, taking its name from the Porter family, original owners of the town site.
