= Tanner, Missouri =

Unincorporated community in Missouri, U.S.

Coordinates: 36°55′05″N 89°41′00″W

Tanner is an unincorporated community in Scott County, in the U.S. state of Missouri.

== History ==
A post office called Tanner was established in 1923, and remained in operation until 1929. The community has the name of Samuel Tanner, an early settler.
