= Kelso, Missouri =

- Village
- Location of Kelso, Missouri
- Coordinates: 37°11′44″N 89°33′6″W
- Country: United States
- State: Missouri
- County: Scott

Area
  - Total: 0.32 sq mi (0.82 km^{2})
  - Land: 0.32 sq mi (0.82 km^{2})
  - Water: 0 sq mi (0.00 km^{2})
- Elevation: 436 ft (133 m)

Population (2020)
  - Total: 554
  - Density: 1,747.0/sq mi (674.52/km^{2})
- Time zone: UTC-6 (Central (CST))
  - Summer (DST): UTC-5 (CDT)
- ZIP code: 63758
- Area code: 573
- FIPS code: 29-38216
- GNIS feature ID: 0720525

Kelso is a village in Scott County, Missouri, United States. As of the 2020 census, Kelso had a population of 554.

The Kelso ZIP code of 63758 is used for residents who wish to receive their mail at the Kelso post office; direct mail delivery in Kelso uses the Scott City ZIP code of 63780.

== History ==
Kelso was settled in the 1850s. A post office called Kelso has been in operation since 1858. The community has the name of I. R. Kelso, a pioneer citizen.

== Geography ==
Kelso is located three miles southwest of Scott City and 120 miles south of St. Louis. U.S. Route 61, often called the Blues Highway, passes through Kelso.

Kelso is located at 37°11′44″N 89°33′6″W (37.195450, -89.551591).

According to the United States Census Bureau, the village has a total area of 0.32 square miles (0.83 km^{2}), all land.

== Demographics ==
Historical population
Census	Pop.	Note	%±
1910	190		—
1920	228		20.0%
1930	221		−3.1%
1940	223		0.9%
1950	276		23.8%
1960	258		−6.5%
1970	401		55.4%
1980	455		13.5%
1990	526		15.6%
2000	527		0.2%
2010	586		11.2%
2020	554		−5.5%

=== 2010 census ===
As of the census of 2010, there were 586 people, 228 households, and 168 families living in the village. The population density was 1,831.3 inhabitants per square mile (707.1/km^{2}). There were 243 housing units at an average density of 759.4 per square mile (293.2/km^{2}). The racial makeup of the village was 98.63% White, 0.17% Black or African American, 0.17% Native Hawaiian or Pacific Islander, 0.51% from other races, and 0.51% from two or more races. Hispanic or Latino of any race were 0.51% of the population.

There were 228 households, of which 28.9% had children under the age of 18 living with them, 65.8% were married couples living together, 5.7% had a female householder with no husband present, 2.2% had a male householder with no wife present, and 26.3% were non-families. 22.4% of all households were made up of individuals, and 10.1% had someone living alone who was 65 years of age or older. The average household size was 2.57 and the average family size was 3.04.

The median age in the village was 41 years. 21.3% of residents were under the age of 18; 8.8% were between the ages of 18 and 24; 24.1% were from 25 to 44; 30% were from 45 to 64; and 15.9% were 65 years of age or older. The gender makeup of the village was 50.2% male and 49.8% female.

=== 2000 census ===
As of the census of 2000, there were 527 people, 216 households, and 147 families living in the village. The population density was 1,653.2 inhabitants per square mile (638.3/km^{2}). There were 226 housing units at an average density of 709.0 per square mile (273.7/km^{2}). The racial makeup of the village was 97.34% White, 0.19% Native American, 1.33% from other races, and 1.14% from two or more races. Hispanic or Latino of any race were 2.09% of the population. The predominant religion is Catholicism.

There were 216 households, out of which 29.6% had children under the age of 18 living with them, 60.2% were married couples living together, 5.6% had a female householder with no husband present, and 31.5% were non-families. 28.2% of all households were made up of individuals, and 17.1% had someone living alone who was 65 years of age or older. The average household size was 2.44 and the average family size was 3.01.

In the village, the population was spread out, with 25.4% under the age of 18, 6.6% from 18 to 24, 30.0% from 25 to 44, 19.4% from 45 to 64, and 18.6% who were 65 years of age or older. The median age was 38 years. For every 100 females, there were 93.8 males. For every 100 females age 18 and over, there were 90.8 males.

The median income for a household in the village was $45,294, and the median income for a family was $51,719. Males had a median income of $37,500 versus $21,518 for females. The per capita income for the village was $19,099. None of the families and 1.6% of the population were living below the poverty line, including no under-18s and 4.5% of those over 64.

== Education ==
It is in the Kelso C-7 School District, an elementary only district

Three Rivers College's service area includes Scott County.
