= McMullin, Missouri =

Unincorporated community in Missouri, U.S.

Coordinates: 36.95417°N 89.62028°W

McMullin is an unincorporated community in Scott County, in the U.S. state of Missouri. The town site is located north of Sikeston on the El Camino Real, known today as U.S. Route 61.

A post office called McMullin was established in 1903, and remained in operation until 1924. The community has the name of Charlie McMullin, an early settler. A variant name was "Grant City". McMullin School existed from roughly 1912 until 1953.
