= Rockview, Missouri =

Rockview
- Unincorporated community
- Location within Missouri
- Coordinates: 37°12′08″N 89°38′22″W
- Country: United States
- State: Missouri
- County: Scott County

Rockview is an unincorporated community in Scott County, in the U.S. state of Missouri.

== History ==
A post office called Rockview was established in 1901, and remained in operation until 1915. The community was so named on account of rock outcroppings near the original town site.

On May 25, 2013, seven people were injured in a T-bone train collision that brought down a Rockview highway overpass and derailed twelve Union Pacific train cars.
