= Blodgett, Missouri =

- Village
- Location of Blodgett, Missouri
- Coordinates: 37°0′17″N 89°31′35″W
- Country: United States
- State: Missouri
- County: Scott

Area
  - Total: 0.13 sq mi (0.34 km^{2})
  - Land: 0.13 sq mi (0.34 km^{2})
  - Water: 0 sq mi (0.00 km^{2})
- Elevation: 325 ft (99 m)

Population (2020)
  - Total: 209
  - Density: 1,589.6/sq mi (613.76/km^{2})
- Time zone: UTC-6 (Central (CST))
  - Summer (DST): UTC-5 (CDT)
- ZIP code: 63824
- Area code: 573
- FIPS code: 29-06346
- GNIS feature ID: 2398134

Blodgett is a village in Scott County, Missouri, United States. As of the 2020 census, Blodgett had a population of 209.

== History ==
Blodgett was settled as early as 1869. A post office called Blodgett has been in operation since 1870. The community has the name of Wells H. Blodgett, a railroad official. The town was incorporated in 1900.

== Geography ==
According to the United States Census Bureau, the village has a total area of 0.13 square miles (0.34 km^{2}), all land.

== Demographics ==
Historical population
Census	Pop.	Note	%±
1880	43		—
1900	209		—
1910	422		101.9%
1920	392		−7.1%
1930	252		−35.7%
1940	253		0.4%
1950	218		−13.8%
1960	203		−6.9%
1970	220		8.4%
1980	255		15.9%
1990	202		−20.8%
2000	265		31.2%
2010	213		−19.6%
2020	209		−1.9%
U.S. Decennial Census

=== 2010 census ===
As of the census of 2010, there were 213 people, 75 households, and 56 families living in the village. The population density was 1,638.5 inhabitants per square mile (632.6/km^{2}). There were 92 housing units at an average density of 707.7 per square mile (273.2/km^{2}). The racial makeup of the village was 92.96% White, 1.88% Black or African American, 0.47% Native American, 0.47% Asian, and 4.23% from two or more races. Hispanic or Latino of any race were 2.82% of the population.

There were 75 households, of which 48.0% had children under the age of 18 living with them, 50.7% were married couples living together, 13.3% had a female householder with no husband present, 10.7% had a male householder with no wife present, and 25.3% were non-families. 20.0% of all households were made up of individuals, and 8% had someone living alone who was 65 years of age or older. The average household size was 2.84 and the average family size was 3.20.

The median age in the village was 36.6 years. 30.5% of residents were under the age of 18; 10.3% were between the ages of 18 and 24; 27.8% were from 25 to 44; 21.6% were from 45 to 64; and 9.9% were 65 years of age or older. The gender makeup of the village was 51.6% male and 48.4% female.

=== 2000 census ===
As of the census of 2000, there were 265 people, 98 households, and 77 families living in the village. The population density was 1,999.5 inhabitants per square mile (772.0/km^{2}). There were 104 housing units at an average density of 784.7 per square mile (303.0/km^{2}). The racial makeup of the village was 98.49% White, 0.38% African American, 0.38% from other races, and 0.75% from two or more races.

There were 98 households, out of which 36.7% had children under the age of 18 living with them, 66.3% were married couples living together, 7.1% had a female householder with no husband present, and 21.4% were non-families. 16.3% of all households were made up of individuals, and 11.2% had someone living alone who was 65 years of age or older. The average household size was 2.70 and the average family size was 3.01.

In the village, the population was spread out, with 27.2% under the age of 18, 7.9% from 18 to 24, 26.0% from 25 to 44, 26.0% from 45 to 64, and 12.8% who were 65 years of age or older. The median age was 38 years. For every 100 females, there were 100.8 males. For every 100 females age 18 and over, there were 87.4 males.

The median income for a household in the village was $33,194, and the median income for a family was $35,278. Males had a median income of $28,214 versus $16,750 for females. The per capita income for the village was $14,674. About 4.9% of families and 7.4% of the population were below the poverty line, including 12.1% of those under the age of eighteen and 4.9% of those 65 or over.

== Education ==
It is in the Scott County R-IV School District.

Prior to 1954, the community had its own school district. That year, it consolidated into Scott County R-IV.

Three Rivers College's service area includes Scott County.

=== Historic area public schools ===
- Boardman School (1912 – c.1925) was located near State Highway H and Scott County Highway 529, consolidated with Blodgett.
- Claypool School (1910 – c.1921) was located at the corner of Scott County Highways 448 and 405, absorbed by Blodgett around 1922.
- Pheasant Valley School (c.1919 – 1921) was located on State Highway H, absorbed by Blodgett in 1922.
- White Oak School (1909 – 1921) was located on Scott County Highway 524, absorbed by Blodgett in 1922.
