= Tornado outbreak of May 7–9, 1927 =

Weather event in the United States

Coordinates: 40.5564°N 94.9716°W

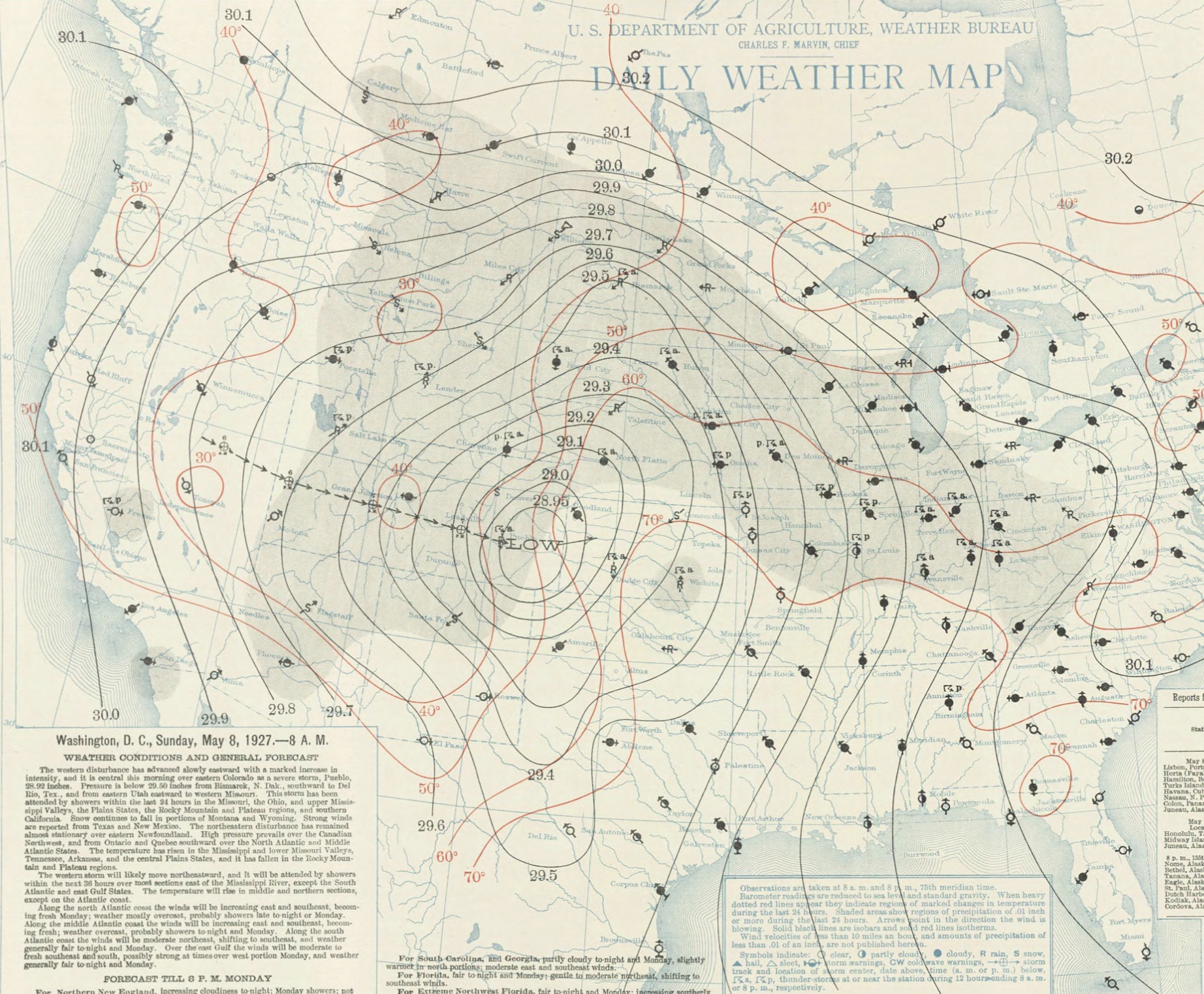
- Weather map on May 8

Tornado outbreak
- Tornadoes: ≥ 38
- Max. rating: F5 tornado
- Duration: May 7–9, 1927

Overall effects
- Fatalities: ≥ 217
- Injuries: ≥ 1,156
- Damage: > $7,574,000 ($140,380,000 in 2025 USD) (Note: All losses are in 1927 United States dollars unless otherwise noted.)
- Areas affected: Midwestern and Southern United States
- Part of the tornadoes and tornado outbreaks of 1927

On May 7–9, 1927, a deadly and destructive tornado outbreak affected the Midwestern and Southern United States, producing numerous strong tornadoes that killed 217 or more people. The strongest tornado of the outbreak, retroactively rated F5 on the Fujita scale, was a long-tracked tornado family that killed 10 people in southern Kansas on May 7. The deadliest tornado of the outbreak hit Poplar Bluff, Missouri, on May 9, doing F4 damage and killing at least 98 people. Other F4s that day collectively killed 75 people in Texas and Arkansas; a pair of F3s in the latter state killed 20. A few F4s in Missouri on May 8 also claimed 10 lives. According to tornado historian Thomas P. Grazulis, May 9, 1927, was "among the worst tornado days in U.S. history", featuring nine tornadoes that killed at least five people. (Note: An outbreak is generally defined as a group of at least six tornadoes (the number sometimes varies slightly according to local climatology) with no more than a six-hour gap between individual tornadoes. An outbreak sequence, prior to (after) the start of modern records in 1950, is defined as a period of no more than two (one) consecutive days without at least one significant (F2 or stronger) tornado.)

== Confirmed tornadoes ==
Confirmed tornadoes by Fujita rating
| FU | F0 | F1 | F2 | F3 | F4 | F5 | Total |
|---|---|---|---|---|---|---|---|
| 2 | ? | 1 | 18 | 8 | 8 | 1 | ≥ 38 |

Prior to 1990, there is a likely undercount of tornadoes, particularly E/F0–1, with reports of weaker tornadoes becoming more common as population increased. A sharp increase in the annual average E/F0–1 count by approximately 200 tornadoes was noted upon the implementation of NEXRAD Doppler weather radar in 1990–1991. (Note: Historically, the number of tornadoes globally and in the United States was and is likely underrepresented: research by Grazulis on annual tornado activity suggests that, as of 2001, only 53% of yearly U.S. tornadoes were officially recorded. Documentation of tornadoes outside the United States was historically less exhaustive, owing to the lack of monitors in many nations and, in some cases, to internal political controls on public information. Most countries only recorded tornadoes that produced severe damage or loss of life. Significant low biases in U.S. tornado counts likely occurred through the early 1990s, when advanced NEXRAD was first installed and the National Weather Service began comprehensively verifying tornado occurrences.) 1974 marked the first year where significant tornado (E/F2+) counts became homogenous with contemporary values, attributed to the consistent implementation of Fujita scale assessments. (Note: The Fujita scale was devised under the aegis of scientist T. Theodore Fujita in the early 1970s. Prior to the advent of the scale in 1971, tornadoes in the United States were officially unrated. Tornado ratings were retroactively applied to events prior to the formal adoption of the F-scale by the National Weather Service. While the Fujita scale has been superseded by the Enhanced Fujita scale in the U.S. since February 1, 2007, Canada used the old scale until April 1, 2013; nations elsewhere, like the United Kingdom, apply other classifications such as the TORRO scale.) Numerous discrepancies on the details of tornadoes in this outbreak exist between sources. The total count of tornadoes and ratings differs from various agencies accordingly. The list below documents information from the most contemporary official sources alongside assessments from Grazulis.

=== May 7 event ===
Confirmed tornadoes – Sunday, May 7, 1927 (Note: All dates are based on the local time zone where the tornado touched down; however, all times are in Coordinated Universal Time and dates are split at midnight CST/CDT for consistency.)
| F# | Location | County / Parish | State | Time (UTC) | Path length | Width (Note: The listed width values are primarily the average/mean width of the tornadoes, with those having known maximum widths denoted by ♯. From 1952 to 1994, reports largely list mean width whereas contemporary years list maximum width. Values provided by Grazulis are the average width, with estimates being rounded down (i.e. 0.5 mi (0.80 km) is rounded down from 880 yards to 800 yards.) | Damage |
|---|---|---|---|---|---|---|---|
| F5 | SW of Aetna to eastern Hutchinson to SSW of McPherson | Comanche, Barber, Kingman, Reno, McPherson | KS | 00:00–? | 95 mi (153 km) | 3,520 yd (3,220 m)♯ | $1,300,000 |
| F5 | 10 deaths – This intense, long-lived tornado family may have formed in Oklahoma. At least two large tornadoes, up to 2 mi (3.2 km) wide, hit over 100 farms, some of which were obliterated, causing four deaths near Medicine Lodge and a fifth near Kingman. In Hutchinson the tornado(es) inflicted three deaths and losses of $750,000. A few final deaths took place near McPherson. In all 300 injuries occurred, and power lines were mangled. Wind or related tornado damage extended another 23 mi (37 km). | | | | | | |

=== May 8 event ===
Confirmed tornadoes – Monday, May 8, 1927
| F# | Location | County / Parish | State | Time (UTC) | Path length | Width | Damage |
|---|---|---|---|---|---|---|---|
| F3 | W of North Platte to E of Hershey | Lincoln | NE | 12:15–? | 15 mi (24 km) | 100 yd (91 m) | $45,000 |
| F3 | A narrow tornado struck eight farms, doing F3 damage to half of them and injuring three people. This and the next event belonged to a 34-mile (55 km) family. | | | | | | |
| F3 | W and NW of Stapleton | Lincoln | NE | 16:00–? | 18 mi (29 km) | 400 yd (370 m) | $50,000 |
| F3 | A tornado hit ranches, wrecking at least three homes and causing an injury. | | | | | | |
| F2 | Between Sutherland and Calumet to SE of Hartley | O'Brien | IA | 02:00–? | 6 mi (9.7 km) | 200 yd (180 m) | $20,000 |
| F2 | A tornado tore apart sheds, injuring a person, and hit a farm, wrecking all buildings but the farmhouse. | | | | | | |
| F4 | Near Macks Creek to western Eldon to W of Olean | Camden, Miller | MO | 02:00–? | 35 mi (56 km) | 300 yd (270 m) | >$120,000 |
| F4 | 4 deaths – A violent tornado flattened much timber in Camden County, but hit few buildings. At Eldon it did major damage, wrecking about 20 homes, with a loss of $120,000. Downbursts may have hit Olean, inflicting more damage. 33 injuries occurred. | | | | | | |
| F4 | NW of Jefferson City to W of New Bloomfield to S of Benton City | Cole, Boone, Callaway, Audrain | MO | 03:15–? | 40 mi (64 km) | 400 yd (370 m) | $170,000 |
| F4 | 6 deaths – Related to the previous event, an extremely potent tornado family swept away a well-built home, snapping a 16 ft × 6 ft × 0.33 ft (4.88 m × 1.83 m × 0.10 m) concrete basement wall segment to which it was bolted, which fatally crushed a few family members. It also destroyed barns on 12 or more farms and annihilated large houses. 30 injuries occurred. | | | | | | |
| F3 | NW of Ava | Douglas | MO | 04:00–? | 9 mi (14 km) | 400 yd (370 m) | Unknown |
| F3 | 2 deaths – A tornado destroyed nine homes, injuring 30 people. | | | | | | |

=== May 9 event ===
Confirmed tornadoes – Tuesday, May 9, 1927
| F# | Location | County / Parish | State | Time (UTC) | Path length | Width | Damage |
|---|---|---|---|---|---|---|---|
| F4 | SW of Nevada to N of Josephine to E of Farmersville | Collin | TX | 08:25–? | 15 mi (24 km) | 400 yd (370 m) | >$650,000 |
| F4 | 19 deaths – A tornado leveled western Nevada, sweeping away several homes and causing 16 deaths there. The tornado wrecked 75% of the town itself and injured 100 or more—possibly as many as 200—people; the injured were hospitalized in five towns. Beyond Nevada the tornado tore apart many farmhouses as well, but most people heard the tornado and sheltered, reducing the death toll. | | | | | | |
| F4 | WNW of Greenville to E of Celeste to near Wolfe City | Hunt | TX | 09:00–? | 15 mi (24 km) | 400 yd (370 m) | $150,000 |
| F4 | 6 deaths – Related to the previous F4, this event struck about 20 farms and swept away a few homes, killing four people in one of them. It also leveled many other farmhouses. 20 injuries occurred. | | | | | | |
| F2 | Washington Township | Porter | IN | 09:00–? | Unknown | Unknown | Unknown |
| F2 | A tornado wrecked several barns near Blackley Corner. | | | | | | |
| F4 | Northern Garland | Dallas | TX | 09:10–? | 1 mi (1.6 km) | 200 yd (180 m) | $65,000 |
| F4 | 15 deaths – Brief but very destructive, a low-end F4 tornado badly damaged five blocks, leveling a few homes and lofting debris 10 mi (16 km); it meandered, at one point turning 180°. 40 injuries occurred. An EF4 tornado also hit Garland on December 26, 2015. | | | | | | |
| F2 | NW of Holland to Beckett Mountain | Faulkner | AR | 19:00–? | 12 mi (19 km) | 200 yd (180 m) | Unknown |
| F2 | An intermittent tornado destroyed a barn and home. | | | | | | |
| FU | W of La Harpe | Hancock | IL | 19:00–? | 3 mi (4.8 km) | 30 yd (27 m) | Unknown |
| FU | A tornado downed fences and outbuildings, killing poultry. | | | | | | |
| F3 | Hickory Township | Schuyler, Fulton | IL | 20:10–? | 12 mi (19 km) | 100 yd (91 m) | $40,000 |
| F3 | 1 death – A tornado paralleled and tracked north of the Illinois River, wrecking five farmhouses. It also leveled barns, killed a boy, and injured a dozen people. | | | | | | |
| F2 | Southern Shreveport | Caddo | LA | 20:25–20:30 | 1 mi (1.6 km) | 100 yd (91 m) | $5,000 |
| F2 | A low-end F2 tornado hit a block, unroofing a pair of homes, destroying another, damaging other buildings, and felling trees. | | | | | | |
| F2 | Near Eden | Peoria | IL | 20:30–? | Unknown | 100 yd (91 m) | $10,000 |
| F2 | A tornado unroofed a home, carrying its roof 1/4 mi (0.40 km) away, and did other slight damage. | | | | | | |
| F2 | Near Scott to S of Lonoke | Pulaski, Lonoke | AR | 20:30–21:00 | 15 mi (24 km) | 300 yd (270 m) | Unknown |
| F2 | A tornado destroyed barns and small homes, injuring seven people. | | | | | | |
| F3 | W of Carlisle to near Birdeye | Lonoke, Prairie, Woodruff, St. Francis, Cross | AR | 20:30–22:00 | 75 mi (121 km) | 200 yd (180 m) | $55,000 |
| F3 | 8+ deaths – A long-lived family of three or more tornadoes swept away homes, killing half a dozen people at Center Point, Prairie County. It also severely damaged rural property, injuring 69 people. An additional death may have occurred as well. | | | | | | |
| F4 | Northern Imboden (AR) to E of Currentview (MO) to Poplar Bluff (MO) | Lawrence (AR), Randolph (AR), Ripley (MO), Butler (MO) | AR, MO | 20:35–21:20 | 60 mi (97 km) | 880 yd (800 m)♯ | $2,382,000 |
| F4 | 98+ deaths – A catastrophic tornado first did F4 damage to 15 homes at Imboden and killed five people in the Brockett–Maynard area. Entering Missouri, it damaged several thousand trees and caused 10 deaths, including half a dozen in an automobile. It then devastated 31 blocks of Poplar Bluff, killing 83 or more people, including 21 in a hotel alone. 300 injuries occurred. The tornado is the third deadliest to hit Missouri, after the Marshfield Cyclone of 1880 (99 dead) and the Joplin tornado of 2011 (158 dead). | | | | | | |
| F4 | SW of Hoxie to E of Walnut Ridge | Lawrence | AR | 20:50–21:00 | 5 mi (8.0 km) | 50 yd (46 m) | $300,000 |
| F4 | 11 deaths – A short-lived tornado ravaged Hoxie, destroying 100 buildings, ripping off the upper story of a new high school, and killing two students. It also leveled numerous homes in town and near Walnut Ridge. A few families collectively lost nine people. 200 injuries occurred. | | | | | | |
| F2 | Near Kingsland to near Toledo to near Randall | Cleveland, Lincoln | AR | 21:10–21:27 | 28 mi (45 km) | 400 yd (370 m) | $30,000 |
| F2 | 9 deaths – This tornado seemed to become more intense toward the end of its path, causing 24 injuries. | | | | | | |
| F2 | N of Kingston | Madison | AR | 21:15–? | Unknown | Unknown | Unknown |
| F2 | A tornado destroyed a home, causing four injuries. | | | | | | |
| F3 | SW of Egypt to E of Stanford | Craighead, Lawrence, Greene | AR | 21:15–? | 27 mi (43 km) | 100 yd (91 m) | $5,000 |
| F3 | 12 deaths – A tornado destroyed many barns and homes, killing a mother and her five children. It also caused three more deaths in another home. Eight injuries occurred. | | | | | | |
| F2 | Bethesda | Independence | AR | 21:20–? | Unknown | 400 yd (370 m) | $25,000 |
| F2 | A tornado unroofed or destroyed six homes. | | | | | | |
| F2 | Norphlet | Union | AR | 21:30–? | 2 mi (3.2 km) | 150 yd (140 m) | $150,000 |
| F2 | 1 death – A tornado damaged all of Norphlet, including oil derricks and homes. It tossed a derrick against a hospital, injuring a person, and unroofed, shifted, or collapsed homes in town. Most losses were to oilfield equipment, but crops were damaged as well. 35 injuries occurred. | | | | | | |
| F4 | Strong | Union | AR | 22:20–? | 6 mi (9.7 km) | 300 yd (270 m) | $500,000 |
| F4 | 24 deaths – A tornado ripped apart downtown Strong, obliterating "the best homes" and killing well-to-do citizens, according to an account quoted by Grazulis. 72 injuries occurred. | | | | | | |
| F2 | NW of Long Grove to SE of DeWitt | Scott, Clinton | IA | 22:20–? | 10 mi (16 km) | 600 yd (550 m) | $22,000 |
| F2 | A tornado wrecked buildings on three farms, including one or more barns, and damaged trees. | | | | | | |
| F3 | E of Morrisonville to NE of Decatur | Christian, Macon | IL | 22:25–? | 45 mi (72 km) | 400 yd (370 m) | $1,000,000 |
| F3 | 1 death – An intense tornado did borderline-F4 damage in Christian County, injuring 67 people on farms, and lightly damaged more than 1,000 homes in or near Decatur. In all 116 injuries occurred. | | | | | | |
| F2 | N of Owaneco | Christian | IL | 22:30–? | 5 mi (8.0 km) | 200 yd (180 m) | $20,000 |
| F2 | A tornado destroyed a number of barns. | | | | | | |
| F2 | Near Clarence | Natchitoches | LA | 22:30–? | 3 mi (4.8 km) | 200 yd (180 m) | Unknown |
| F2 | 1 death – A tornado destroyed two small homes, felled much timber, and blew a third home 60 yd (55 m) off its foundation, injuring seven people. Three other injuries occurred as well. | | | | | | |
| F3 | SW of Carterville to Herrin to West Frankfort | Williamson | IL | 22:55–? | 16 mi (26 km) | 400 yd (370 m) | $343,000 |
| F3 | A tornado unroofed about 100 homes at Carterville. It also damaged 100 more at Herrin, of which it destroyed 12. West Frankfort and the Ezra community reported losses of $100,000, along with 11 injuries. Greenhouses along the path were impacted as well. In all 21 injuries occurred. | | | | | | |
| F2 | SW of Calvin | Winn | LA | 00:30–? | 8 mi (13 km) | 800 yd (730 m) | Unknown |
| F2 | A wide tornado splintered or uprooted several hundred trees. It also destroyed rural buildings and oil derricks, while unroofing homes. | | | | | | |
| F2 | NW of Joppa (IL) to New Columbia (IL) to E of Samoth (IL) | McCracken (KY), Massac (IL) | KY, IL | 00:30–? | 10 mi (16 km) | 600 yd (550 m) | $60,000 |
| F2 | 6 deaths – A strong tornado wrecked eight homes at New Columbia, with five deaths in a few of them. A man died aboard a towboat on the Ohio River as well. 20 injuries occurred. | | | | | | |
| F2 | SW of Renick to E of Moberly | Randolph, Monroe | MO | 02:00–? | 10 mi (16 km) | 300 yd (270 m) | $7,000 |
| F2 | Wrecking a pair of barns, a tornado also blew two homes off their foundations, both of which it unroofed. | | | | | | |
| F2 | W of Walker | Ottawa | MI | Unknown | Unknown | Unknown | Unknown |
| F2 | A tornado damaged a few homes, destroyed a pair of barns, wrecked an automobile, and killed livestock. | | | | | | |
| F2 | Near Loomis to near Beaverton | Isabella, Clare, Gladwin | MI | Unknown | 10 mi (16 km) | Unknown | $50,000 |
| F2 | A tornado damaged 40 farm buildings, among them barns. | | | | | | |
| F1 | Tigertown | Lamar | TX | Unknown | Unknown | Unknown | Unknown |
| F1 | This tornado was related to the Nevada–Wolfe City family. | | | | | | |
| FU | Fredonia | Ozaukee | WI | Unknown | Unknown | Unknown | Unknown |
| FU | A tornado downed some trees. | | | | | | |

== See also ==
- List of North American tornadoes and tornado outbreaks

== Sources ==
- Agee, Ernest M.; Childs, Samuel (June 1, 2014). "Adjustments in Tornado Counts, F-Scale Intensity, and Path Width for Assessing Significant Tornado Destruction". Journal of Applied Meteorology and Climatology. 53 (6). American Meteorological Society: 1494–1505. doi:10.1175/JAMC-D-13-0235.1.
- Brooks, Harold E. (April 2004). "On the Relationship of Tornado Path Length and Width to Intensity". Weather and Forecasting. 19 (2): 310–19. Bibcode:2004WtFor..19..310B. doi:10.1175/1520-0434(2004)019<0310:OTROTP>2.0.CO;2.
- Cook, A. R.; Schaefer, J. T. (August 2008). "The Relation of El Niño–Southern Oscillation (ENSO) to Winter Tornado Outbreaks". Monthly Weather Review. 136 (8): 3121–3137. Bibcode:2008MWRv..136.3121C. doi:10.1175/2007MWR2171.1.
- Edwards, Roger; LaDue, James G.; Ferree, John T.; Scharfenberg, Kevin; Maier, Chris; Coulbourne, William L. (May 1, 2013). "Tornado Intensity Estimation: Past, Present, and Future". Bulletin of the American Meteorological Society. 94 (5). American Meteorological Society: 641–653. doi:10.1175/BAMS-D-11-00006.1.
- Grazulis, Thomas P. (May 1984). Violent Tornado Climatography, 1880–1982. OSTI (Technical report). NUREG. Washington, D.C.: Nuclear Regulatory Commission. OSTI 7099491. CR-3670.
  - — (November 1990). Significant Tornadoes 1880–1989. Vol. 2. St. Johnsbury, Vermont: The Tornado Project of Environmental Films. ISBN 1-879362-02-3.
  - — (July 1993). Significant Tornadoes 1680–1991: A Chronology and Analysis of Events. St. Johnsbury, Vermont: The Tornado Project of Environmental Films. ISBN 1-879362-03-1.
  - — (2001a). The Tornado: Nature's Ultimate Windstorm. Norman: University of Oklahoma Press. ISBN 978-0-8061-3538-0.
  - — (2001b). F5-F6 Tornadoes. St. Johnsbury, Vermont: The Tornado Project of Environmental Films.
- National Historical Company (1882). "34: Tornadoes". The History of Nodaway County, Missouri. St. Louis, Missouri: National Historical Company. pp. 502–11. LCCN 01001371 – via Internet Archive.
- U.S. Weather Bureau (May 1927). "Severe Local Storms, May, 1927" (PDF). Monthly Weather Review. 55 (5). Washington, D.C.: 247. Bibcode:1927MWRv...55..247.. doi:10.1175/1520-0493(1927)55<247:SLSM>2.0.CO;2. Archived from the original (PDF) on April 29, 2017 – via American Meteorological Society.
