= Scott County, Missouri =

County in Missouri, United States

- County
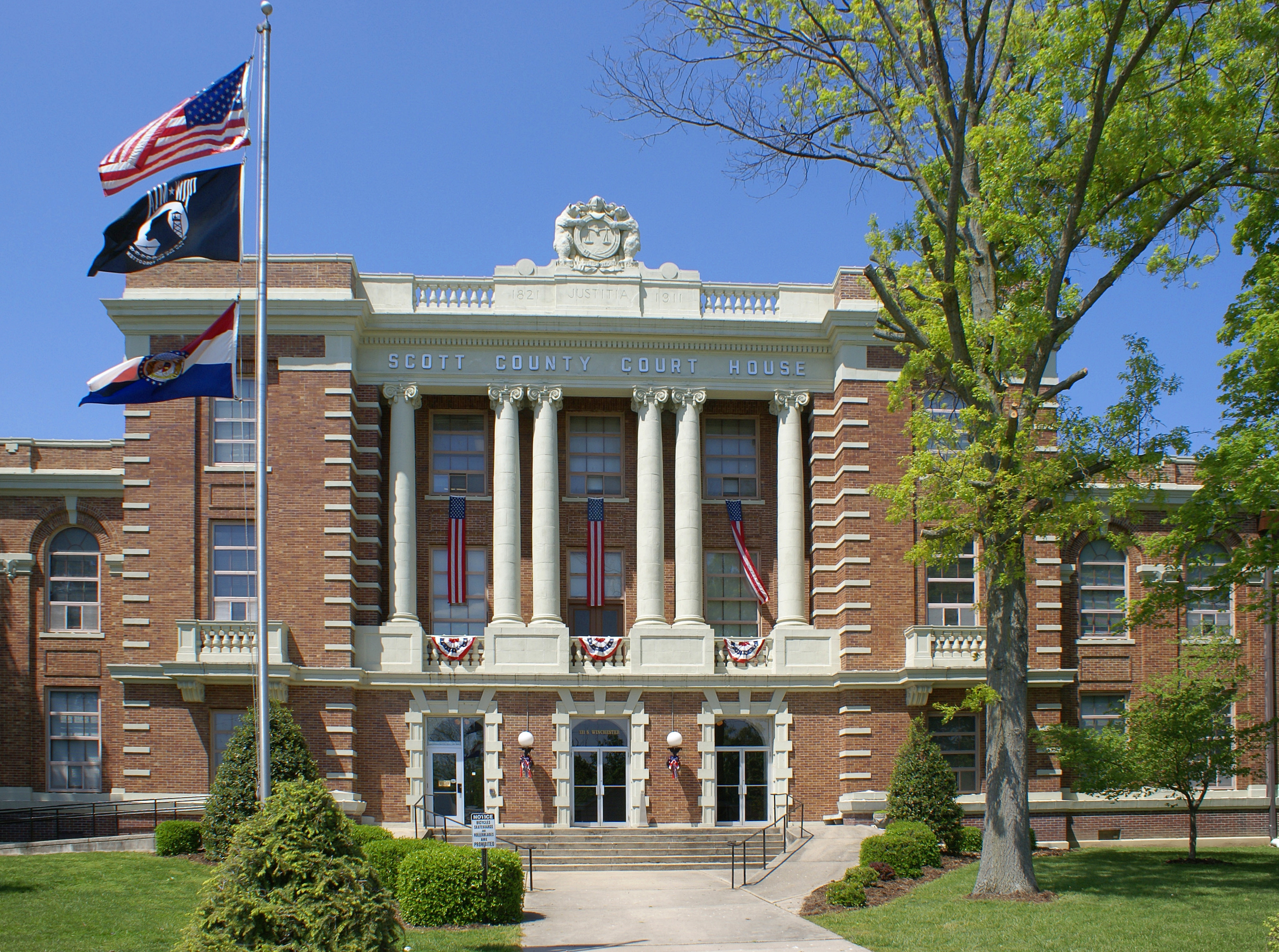
- Scott County courthouse in Benton

- Location within the U.S. state of Missouri
- Coordinates: 37°03′N 89°34′W
- Country: United States
- State: Missouri
- Founded: December 28, 1821
- Named for: John Scott
- Seat: Benton
- Largest city: Sikeston

Area
  - Total: 426 sq mi (1,100 km^{2})
  - Land: 420 sq mi (1,100 km^{2})
  - Water: 5.9 sq mi (15 km^{2}) 1.4%

Population (2020)
  - Total: 38,059
  - Estimate (2025): 37,975 ▼
  - Density: 91/sq mi (35/km^{2})
- Time zone: UTC−6 (Central)
  - Summer (DST): UTC−5 (CDT)
- Congressional district: 8th
- Website: www.scottcountymo.com

Scott County is a county located in the southeastern portion of the U.S. state of Missouri. As of the 2020 census, the population was 38,059. Its county seat is Benton. The county was organized in 1821 and named for U.S. Representative John Scott, the first federal representative from Missouri. Scott County comprises the Sikeston, MO Micropolitan Statistical Area, which is also included in the Cape Girardeau-Sikeston, MO-IL Combined Statistical Area.

== History ==
This area along the Mississippi River was long occupied by indigenous peoples. In historic times, the large and powerful Osage people dominated a large territory including this area and up and west from the later St. Louis, Missouri. Cape La Croix, a rock island in the Mississippi River, has a cross erected by Jesuit missionary Father De Montigny, who traveled with early French explorers in 1699. Some French colonists established trading relationships with the Osage; the traders were based in St. Louis, founded in the late 18th century.

Spain had taken control in 1763 after French lost to Britain in the Seven Years' War. They laid out the King's Highway (El Camino Real) in 1789, a north–south route crossing the county and extending through St. Louis, Missouri. In the late 1790s, Southerners were the first United States settlers on Spanish land grants in this area. France briefly took back the territory, then sold it to the United States in 1803 as part of the Louisiana Purchase.

Delaware (Lenape) and Shawnee people migrated into the area in the 1820s from territories east of the Mississippi, pushed by European-American encroachment on their lands.

The second county formed in Missouri's Southeast Lowland Region, Scott County was created by the Missouri state legislature on December 28, 1821. The county was named in honor of John Scott (1785–1861), the first congressman from Missouri.

One of the earliest settlements was Commerce, Missouri, long known as Tywapitty, derived from an Osage language term. It was an early French fur trading post. Under Spanish rule before 1800, Rezin Bowie was syndic of Tywappity Settlement. (He was the brother of Kentucky frontiersman Jim Bowie.) This was established as a river landing by 1803, and residents formed the first Baptist Church in Missouri there in 1805. Sergeant John Ordway of the Lewis and Clark expedition used the proceeds from his land grant bounty to purchase land in Tywapitty where he farmed cotton and had apple and peach orchards until devastated by the 1811-182 New Madrid earthquakes. The city was platted in 1823 and it served as the Scott county seat from 1864 to 1878.

The current county seat of Benton was laid out in 1822; it is named after Thomas Hart Benton, one of Missouri's first U.S. Senators.

New Hamburg, the third town founded in the county, was settled by a wave of German immigrants in the late 1840s, who came to this country after the German revolutions of 1848. The first log church was St. Lawrence Catholic Church. Sikeston, the largest city in the county and the fourth settlement to be founded, was settled in 1800 and was laid out in 1860 by John Sikes on the Cairo & Fulton Railroad.

The county was devastated by guerrilla raids during the U.S. Civil War. Afterward, it developed rapidly from the 1870s to the early 1900s; its dense forests were lumbered off and numerous railroads were constructed. Towns founded during this period included Diehlstadt, Morley, Oran, Perkins, Blodgett, Crowder, Vanduser, Illmo, Fornfelt (Scott City), Chaffee, Ancell, and Kelso. The Thebes-Mississippi River Railroad Bridge at Illmo was built in 1905.

Located near Morley is the gravesite of Nathaniel W. Watkins, a state legislator and a general in the Missouri State Guards. He was a half-brother of statesman Henry Clay. Wilson Brown, the ninth lieutenant governor of Missouri, lived in the county for a time. Noted early legislators such as Joseph Hunter II and Abraham Hunter also lived here.

Cotton, soybeans, melon and grains were all common crops in rural Scott County. Between the Mississippi River and Little River District drainage ditches lies one of the oldest drainage systems in the United States, Crowley's Ridge, established in 1905, is a remnant of an old coastal floodplain and natural levee that crosses the country.

On January 25, 1942, an African American man named Cleo Wright was lynched in Sikeston. A Scott County all-white grand jury did not return any indictments for the crime after three hours of deliberation.

On January 28, 2004, the Scott County Courthouse was added to the National Register of Historic Places.

== Geography ==
According to the U.S. Census Bureau, the county has a total area of 426 square miles (1,100 km^{2}), of which 420 square miles (1,100 km^{2}) is land and 5.9 square miles (15 km^{2}) (1.4%) is water. The county's eastern border with Illinois is formed by the Mississippi River.

=== Adjacent counties ===
- Cape Girardeau County (northwest)
- Alexander County, Illinois (northeast)
- Mississippi County (southeast)
- New Madrid County (south)
- Stoddard County (southwest)

=== Major highways ===
- Interstate 55
- Interstate 57
- U.S. Route 60
- U.S. Route 61
- U.S. Route 62
- Route 77

== Demographics ==
Historical population
Census	Pop.	Note	%±
1830	2,136		—
1840	5,974		179.7%
1850	3,182		−46.7%
1860	5,247		64.9%
1870	7,317		39.5%
1880	8,587		17.4%
1890	11,228		30.8%
1900	13,092		16.6%
1910	22,372		70.9%
1920	23,409		4.6%
1930	24,913		6.4%
1940	30,377		21.9%
1950	32,842		8.1%
1960	32,748		−0.3%
1970	33,250		1.5%
1980	39,647		19.2%
1990	39,376		−0.7%
2000	40,422		2.7%
2010	39,191		−3.0%
2020	38,059		−2.9%
2025 (est.)	37,975	▼	−0.2%
U.S. Decennial Census; 1790-1960 1900-1990; 1990-2000 2010-2015

=== 2020 census ===
As of the 2020 census, the county had a population of 38,059, and the median age was 40.1 years. 24.0% of residents were under the age of 18 and 18.7% were 65 years of age or older. For every 100 females there were 94.1 males, and for every 100 females age 18 and over there were 90.4 males.

54.0% of residents lived in urban areas, while 46.0% lived in rural areas.

The racial makeup of the county was 81.2% White, 11.8% Black or African American, 0.3% American Indian and Alaska Native, 0.4% Asian, 0.0% Native Hawaiian and Pacific Islander, 1.0% from some other race, and 5.3% from two or more races. Hispanic or Latino residents of any race comprised 2.5% of the population.

There were 15,306 households in the county, of which 30.9% had children under the age of 18 living with them and 29.3% had a female householder with no spouse or partner present. About 28.6% of all households were made up of individuals and 13.2% had someone living alone who was 65 years of age or older.

There were 16,746 housing units, of which 8.6% were vacant. Among occupied housing units, 66.4% were owner-occupied and 33.6% were renter-occupied. The homeowner vacancy rate was 1.7% and the rental vacancy rate was 6.9%.

Scott County, Missouri – Racial and ethnic composition Note: the US Census treats Hispanic/Latino as an ethnic category. This table excludes Latinos from the racial categories and assigns them to a separate category. Hispanics/Latinos may be of any race.
Race / Ethnicity (NH = Non-Hispanic)	Pop 1980	Pop 1990	Pop 2000	Pop 2010	Pop 2020	% 1980	% 1990	% 2000	% 2010	% 2020
White alone (NH)	36,154	35,537	35,221	33,257	30,595	91.19%	90.25%	87.13%	84.86%	80.39%
Black or African American alone (NH)	3,159	3,486	4,217	4,436	4,476	7.97%	8.85%	10.43%	11.32%	11.76%
Native American or Alaska Native alone (NH)	47	82	109	77	84	0.12%	0.21%	0.27%	0.20%	0.22%
Asian alone (NH)	51	62	93	133	149	0.13%	0.16%	0.23%	0.34%	0.39%
Native Hawaiian or Pacific Islander alone (NH)	x	x	3	8	2	x	x	0.01%	0.02%	0.01%
Other race alone (NH)	23	3	15	12	97	0.06%	0.01%	0.04%	0.03%	0.25%
Mixed race or Multiracial (NH)	x	x	316	563	1,721	x	x	0.78%	1.44%	4.52%
Hispanic or Latino (any race)	213	206	448	705	935	0.54%	0.52%	1.11%	1.80%	2.46%
Total	39,647	39,376	40,422	39,191	38,059	100.00%	100.00%	100.00%	100.00%	100.00%

=== 2000 census ===
As of the 2000 census, there were 40,422 people, 15,626 households, and 11,219 families residing in the county. The population density was 37 people per square mile (14 people/km^{2}). There were 16,951 housing units at an average density of 16/km^{2} (41/mi^{2}). The racial makeup of the county was 87.68% White, 10.50% Black or African American, 0.28% Native American, 0.23% Asian, 0.01% Pacific Islander, 0.40% from other races, and 0.90% from two or more races. Approximately 1.11% of the population were Hispanic or Latino of any race.

There were 15,626 households, out of which 35.40% had children under the age of 18 living with them, 54.60% were married couples living together, 13.40% had a female householder with no husband present, and 28.20% were non-families. 25.00% of all households were made up of individuals, and 11.80% had someone living alone who was 65 years of age or older. The average household size was 2.55 and the average family size was 3.03.

In the county, the population was spread out, with 27.40% under the age of 18, 8.50% from 18 to 24, 27.50% from 25 to 44, 22.90% from 45 to 64, and 13.70% who were 65 years of age or older. The median age was 36 years. For every 100 females there were 91.60 males. For every 100 females age 18 and over, there were 86.40 males.

The median income for a household in the county was $39,735, and the median income for a family was $48,847. Males had a median income of $30,169 versus $19,269 for females. The per capita income for the county was $19,363. About 12.30% of families and 16.10% of the population were below the poverty line, including 23.50% of those under age 18 and 13.60% of those age 65 or over.

=== Religion ===
According to the Association of Religion Data Archives County Membership Report (2000), Scott County is a part of the Bible Belt with evangelical Protestantism being the majority religion. The most predominant denominations among residents in Scott County who adhere to a religion are Southern Baptists (40.54%), Roman Catholics (27.12%), and Methodists (9.28%).

== Education ==
Of adults 25 years of age and older in Scott County, 72.9% possesses a high school diploma or higher while 10.6% holds a bachelor's degree or higher as their highest educational attainment.

School districts including sections of the county, no matter how slight, even if the relevant schools and/or administration buildings in another county:

- Chaffee R-II School District
- Kelso C-7 School District (elementary only)
- Oran R-III School District
- Scott City R-I School District
- Scott County Central Schools
- Scott County R-IV School District
- Sikeston School District

=== Public schools ===
- Chaffee R-II School District – Chaffee
  - Chaffee Elementary School (K-06)
  - Chaffee Jr.-Sr. High School (07-12)
- Oran R-III School District – Oran
  - Oran Elementary School (K-06)
  - Oran High School (07-12)
- Scott County R-IV School District – Benton
  - Scott County Elementary School (K-05)
  - Scott County Middle School (06-08)
  - Thomas W. Kelly High School (09-12)
- Scott City R-I School District – Scott City
  - Scott City Elementary School (K-04)
  - Scott City Middle School (05-08)
  - Scott City High School (09-12)
- Scott County Central Schools – Sikeston
  - Scott County Central Elementary School (PK-06)
  - Scott County Central High School (07-12)
- Sikeston School District – Sikeston
  - Sikeston Kindergarten and Early Childhood Center (PK-K)
  - Lee Hunter Elementary (01-04)
  - Southeast Elementary (01-04)
  - Wing Elementary (01-04)
  - Sikeston 5th & 6th Grade Center (05-06)
  - Sikeston Jr. High School (07-08)
  - Sikeston High School (09-12)
  - Sikeston Alternative Education Center
  - Sikeston Career and Technology Center

=== Private schools ===
- St. Denis School – Benton – (01-08) – Roman Catholic
- St. Ambrose School – Chaffee – (K-08) – Roman Catholic
- St. Augustine School – Kelso – (01-08) – Roman Catholic
- Guardian Angel School – Oran – (K-08) – Roman Catholic
- St. Joseph School – Scott City – (K-08) – Roman Catholic
- St. Francis Xavier Christian Academy – Sikeston – (PK-08) – Roman Catholic
- Southeast Missouri Christian Academy – Sikeston – (PK-K) Daycare Center – Non-denominational Christian
- Solid Rock Christian Academy – Sikeston – Non-denominational Christian

=== Colleges and universities ===
- Sikeston Area Higher Education Center (SAHEC) – Sikeston – A satellite campus of Southeast Missouri State University.
- Sikeston Career & Technology Center – Sikeston – A technical school based out of the Sikeston R-VI School District.
- Three Rivers College – Sikeston - The college's service area includes Scott County.

=== Public libraries ===
- Chaffee Public Library
- Sikeston Public Library

== Communities ==
=== Cities ===
- Benton (county seat)
- Cape Girardeau (mostly in Cape Girardeau County)
- Chaffee
- Miner (small part in Mississippi County)
- Morley
- Oran
- Scott City (small part in Cape Girardeau County)
- Sikeston (partly in New Madrid County)

=== Villages ===
- Blodgett
- Commerce
- Diehlstadt
- Haywood City
- Kelso
- Lambert
- Vanduser

=== Census-designated places ===
- New Hamburg
- Perkins
- Fox Meadows

=== Unincorporated communities ===
- Bleda
- Browns
- Crowder
- Kagel
- Lusk
- McMullin
- Parker
- Porter
- Rockview
- Salcedo
- Sargent
- Tanner
- Zewapeta

=== Former community ===
- Illmo

== Politics ==
=== Local ===
The Democratic Party has historically controlled politics at the local level in Scott County. In recent years, however, Republicans have made inroads, gaining control of several county offices in 2018 and 2020. Republicans now hold most elected positions in the county, while Democrats only control the offices of County Clerk, Collector, Commissioner (district 2), Coroner, Recorder, and Surveyor.

Scott County, Missouri

Elected countywide officials
Assessor	Carla Essner	Republican
Circuit Clerk	Stacey Naile	Republican
County Clerk	Allen Seabaugh	Republican
Collector	Mark Hensley	Democratic
Commissioner (presiding)	Danny Tetley	Republican
Commissioner (district 1)	Terry Cole	Republican
Commissioner (district 2)	Donnie Kiefer	Democratic
Coroner	John Cody Caudle	Republican
Prosecuting Attorney	Don Cobb	Republican
Public Administrator	Julia Crader Dolan	Republican
Recorder	Tara Mason	Democratic
Sheriff	Wes Drury	Republican
Surveyor	Brian Strickland	Democratic
Treasurer	Joe Bill Davis	Republican

=== State ===
Scott County is divided into three legislative districts in the Missouri House of Representatives and one district in the Missouri Senate.

- District 148 - Currently represented by Jamie Burger (R-Benton)

Missouri House of Representatives - District 148 - Scott County (2020)
Party	Candidate	Votes	%	±%
Republican	Jamie Burger	11,343	97.80	0

- District 149 - Currently represented by Don Rone Jr. (R-Portageville)

Missouri House of Representatives - District 149 - Scott County (2020)
Party	Candidate	Votes	%	±%
Republican	Don Rone	1,342	92.11	0

- District 151 - Currently represented by Herman Morse (R-Whitewater)

Missouri House of Representatives - District 151 - Scott County (2020)
Party	Candidate	Votes	%	±%
Republican	Herman Morse	2,628	98.91	0

Past Gubernatorial Elections Results
Year	Republican	Democratic	Third Parties
2024	80.20% 13,801	18.07% 3,109	1.73% 298
2020	76.74% 13,535	21.51% 3,794	1.75% 308
2016	65.92% 11,323	31.51% 5,412	2.48% 442
2012	49.99% 8,421	48.04% 8,092	1.98% 333
2008	53.12% 9,494	45.55% 8,142	1.33% 238
2004	58.69% 10,198	40.31% 7,004	1.00% 174
2000	52.12% 8,159	46.59% 7,293	1.29% 202
1996	38.71% 5,878	59.76% 9,074	1.53% 233
1992	47.32% 7,564	52.68% 8,422	0.00% 0
1988	56.49% 7,845	43.45% 6,035	0.06% 8
1984	59.90% 8,446	40.10% 5,654	0.00% 0
1980	49.80% 7,619	50.13% 7,669	0.07% 11
1976	41.63% 5,558	58.37% 7,793	0.01% 1

=== Federal ===
Scott County is included in Missouri's 8th Congressional District and is currently represented by Jason T. Smith (R-Salem) in the U.S. House of Representatives.

U.S. House of Representatives – District 8 – General Election – Scott County (2020)
Party	Candidate	Votes	%	±%
Republican	Jason T. Smith*	13,547	77.62	
Democratic	Kathy Ellis	3,671	21.03	
Libertarian	Tom Schmitz	227	1.30	

U.S. House of Representatives – District 8 – General Election – Scott County (2014)
Party	Candidate	Votes	%	±%
Republican	Jason T. Smith*	5,305	69.67	
Democratic	Barbara Stocker	1,755	23.05	
Libertarian	Rick Vandeven	294	3.86	
Independent	Terry Hampton	145	1.90	
Constitution	Doug Enyart	115	1.51	

==== Political culture ====
United States presidential election results for Scott County, Missouri
Year	Republican		Democratic		Third party(ies)	
Year	No.	%	No.	%	No.	%
1888	629	31.28%	1,382	68.72%	0	0.00%
1892	671	28.66%	1,612	68.86%	58	2.48%
1896	751	28.21%	1,906	71.60%	5	0.19%
1900	821	32.07%	1,706	66.64%	33	1.29%
1904	1,124	41.96%	1,470	54.87%	85	3.17%
1908	1,473	36.79%	1,853	46.28%	678	16.93%
1912	1,235	29.50%	1,945	46.45%	1,007	24.05%
1916	2,285	42.78%	2,816	52.72%	240	4.49%
1920	4,204	49.00%	4,157	48.46%	218	2.54%
1924	3,335	40.54%	3,633	44.16%	1,258	15.29%
1928	3,779	42.25%	5,159	57.68%	6	0.07%
1932	2,310	24.75%	6,948	74.45%	75	0.80%
1936	3,126	28.57%	7,763	70.95%	52	0.48%
1940	4,401	35.66%	7,899	64.00%	42	0.34%
1944	3,995	35.77%	7,132	63.86%	41	0.37%
1948	2,519	23.32%	8,266	76.52%	18	0.17%
1952	4,661	39.45%	7,127	60.33%	26	0.22%
1956	4,654	41.05%	6,683	58.95%	0	0.00%
1960	5,807	47.77%	6,349	52.23%	0	0.00%
1964	3,212	29.95%	7,512	70.05%	0	0.00%
1968	3,856	36.23%	4,313	40.52%	2,474	23.25%
1972	7,316	66.74%	3,646	33.26%	0	0.00%
1976	5,473	40.31%	8,075	59.48%	28	0.21%
1980	8,227	53.65%	6,854	44.69%	255	1.66%
1984	8,727	61.05%	5,569	38.95%	0	0.00%
1988	8,013	57.45%	5,914	42.40%	21	0.15%
1992	6,265	37.95%	7,452	45.14%	2,790	16.90%
1996	6,641	43.54%	7,011	45.97%	1,600	10.49%
2000	8,999	57.30%	6,452	41.09%	253	1.61%
2004	11,330	64.94%	6,057	34.71%	61	0.35%
2008	11,563	63.95%	6,258	34.61%	261	1.44%
2012	11,623	68.37%	5,122	30.13%	254	1.49%
2016	13,168	75.95%	3,575	20.62%	594	3.43%
2020	13,769	77.71%	3,753	21.18%	197	1.11%
2024	13,786	79.13%	3,525	20.23%	110	0.63%

At the presidential level, Scott County was historically a Democratic stronghold, voting Democratic in every election from 1872 through 1976 save Warren Harding's 1920 landslide and Richard Nixon's 1972 landslide. A shift began to become evident in the 1980s, as Scott County voted Republican thrice in a row for the first time, one of those times even being against Southerner Jimmy Carter; however, all three elections were nationally decisive Republican wins, and Bill Clinton was able to recapture the county, albeit not by large margins, in both of his wins. Since then, however, Scott County has transitioned to being a reliable Republican stronghold; as of 2020, it has voted Republican six times in a row, and the Republican vote share has not gone below 60% since 2000. Donald Trump exceeded three-quarters of the vote in both of his runs.

Like most rural areas throughout Southeast Missouri, voters in Scott County generally adhere to socially and culturally conservative principles. In 2004, Missourians voted on a constitutional amendment to define marriage as the union between a man and a woman—it overwhelmingly passed Scott County with 85.32 percent of the vote. The initiative passed the state with 71 percent of support from voters as Missouri became the first state to ban same-sex marriage. In 2006, Missourians voted on a constitutional amendment to fund and legalize embryonic stem cell research in the state—it failed in Scott County with 64.85 percent voting against the measure. The initiative narrowly passed the state with 51 percent of support from voters as Missouri became one of the first states in the nation to approve embryonic stem cell research. Despite Scott County's longstanding tradition of supporting socially conservative platforms, voters in the county have a penchant for advancing populist causes like increasing the minimum wage. In 2006, Missourians voted on a proposition (Proposition B) to increase the minimum wage in the state to $6.50 an hour—it passed Scott County with 67.99 percent of the vote. The proposition strongly passed every single county in Missouri with 75.94 percent voting in favor as the minimum wage was increased to $6.50 an hour in the state. During the same election, voters in five other states also strongly approved increases in the minimum wage.

== See also ==
- National Register of Historic Places listings in Scott County, Missouri
