= Otto Porter Jr. =

American basketball player (born 1993)

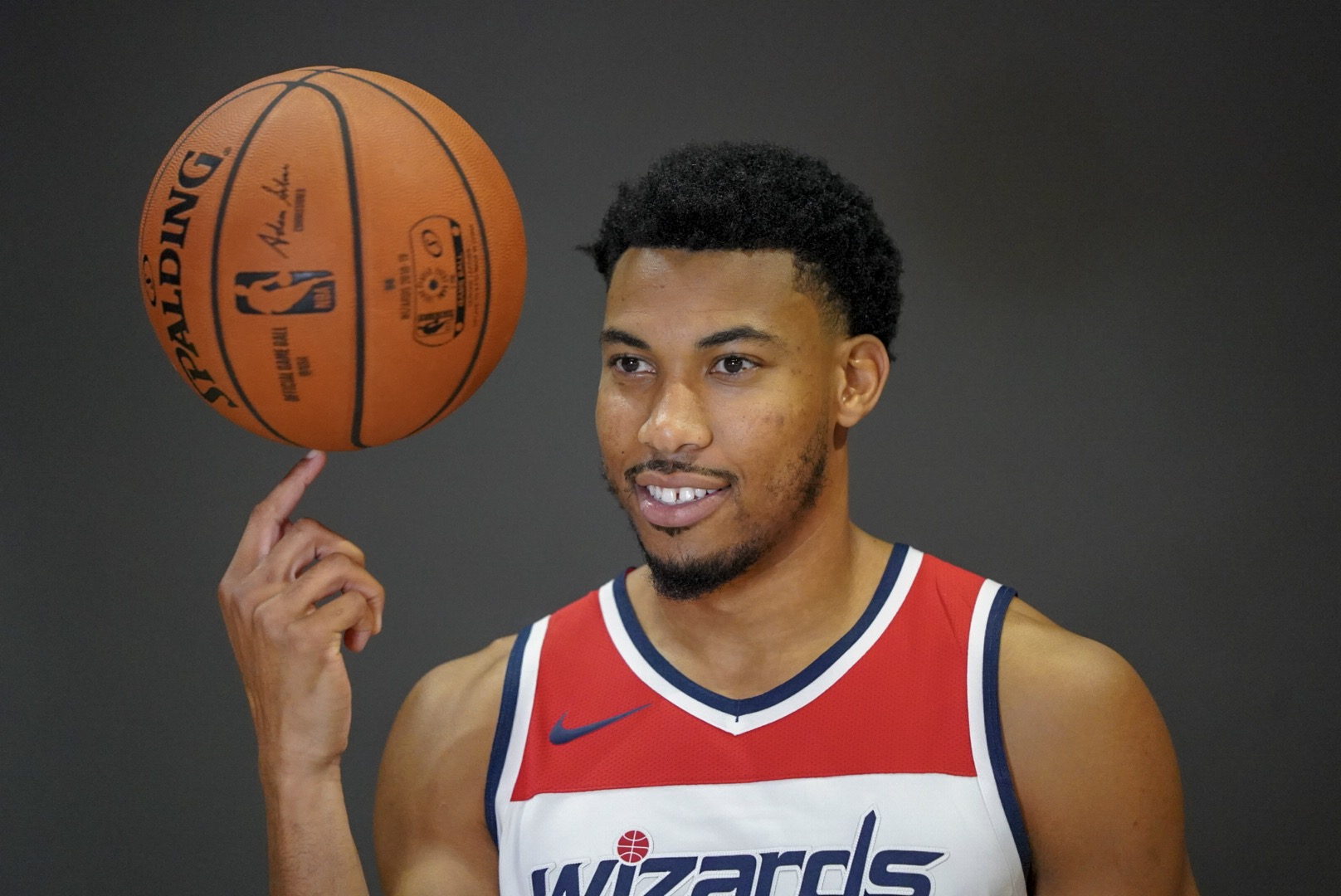
- Porter in 2018

Personal information
- Born: June 3, 1993 (age 33) Haywood City, Missouri, U.S.
- Listed height: 6 ft 8 in (2.03 m)
- Listed weight: 230 lb (104 kg)

Career information
- High school: Scott County Central (Sikeston, Missouri)
- College: Georgetown (2011–2013)
- NBA draft: 2013: 1st round, 3rd overall pick
- Drafted by: Washington Wizards
- Playing career: 2013–2024
- Position: Small forward / power forward
- Number: 22, 32

Career history
- 2013–2019: Washington Wizards
- 2019–2021: Chicago Bulls
- 2021: Orlando Magic
- 2021–2022: Golden State Warriors
- 2022–2024: Toronto Raptors

Career highlights
- NBA champion (2022); Consensus first-team All-American (2013); Big East Player of the Year (2013); First-team All-Big East (2013)
- Stats at NBA.com
- Stats at Basketball Reference

Otto Porter Jr. (born June 3, 1993) is an American former professional basketball player. He played eleven seasons in the National Basketball Association (NBA), and he won an NBA championship when he played for the Golden State Warriors in 2022. He played college basketball for the Georgetown Hoyas and was selected with the third overall pick in the 2013 NBA draft by the Washington Wizards.

== High school career ==
Porter attended Scott County Central High School, whose district includes the small communities of Morley, Vanduser, Haywood City, and parts of rural Sikeston. He earned all-state honors as a junior and senior, leading the Braves to three straight Class 1 state championships and giving Scott Central its state-record 15th title overall. During his senior year, he helped lead the Braves to 29–2 record, averaging 30 points and 14 rebounds a game.

Considered a four-star recruit by Rivals.com, Porter was listed as the No. 8 power forward and the No. 37 player in the nation in 2011.

== College career ==
He signed a letter of intent with the Georgetown Hoyas and played his first game with them on November 12, 2011, against Savannah State, recording 9 points, 8 rebounds and 3 blocks. Rounding out his freshman year, Porter averaged 9.7 points per game and 6.8 rebounds per game. As a sophomore, he nearly doubled his points production, averaging 16.2 points and 7.5 rebounds per game.

At the conclusion of the 2012–13 season, Porter led his team to a 25–7 record and a number 2 seed in the NCAA Division I men's basketball tournament. For his efforts, he was named the Big East Player of the Year and was a finalist for both the Naismith Trophy and Wooden Award. Porter recorded 13 points and 11 rebounds in a first round upset loss to the 15th-seeded Florida Gulf Coast.

On April 15, 2013, Porter announced his decision to forgo his final two years of eligibility and enter the NBA draft.

== Professional career ==
=== Washington Wizards (2013–2019) ===
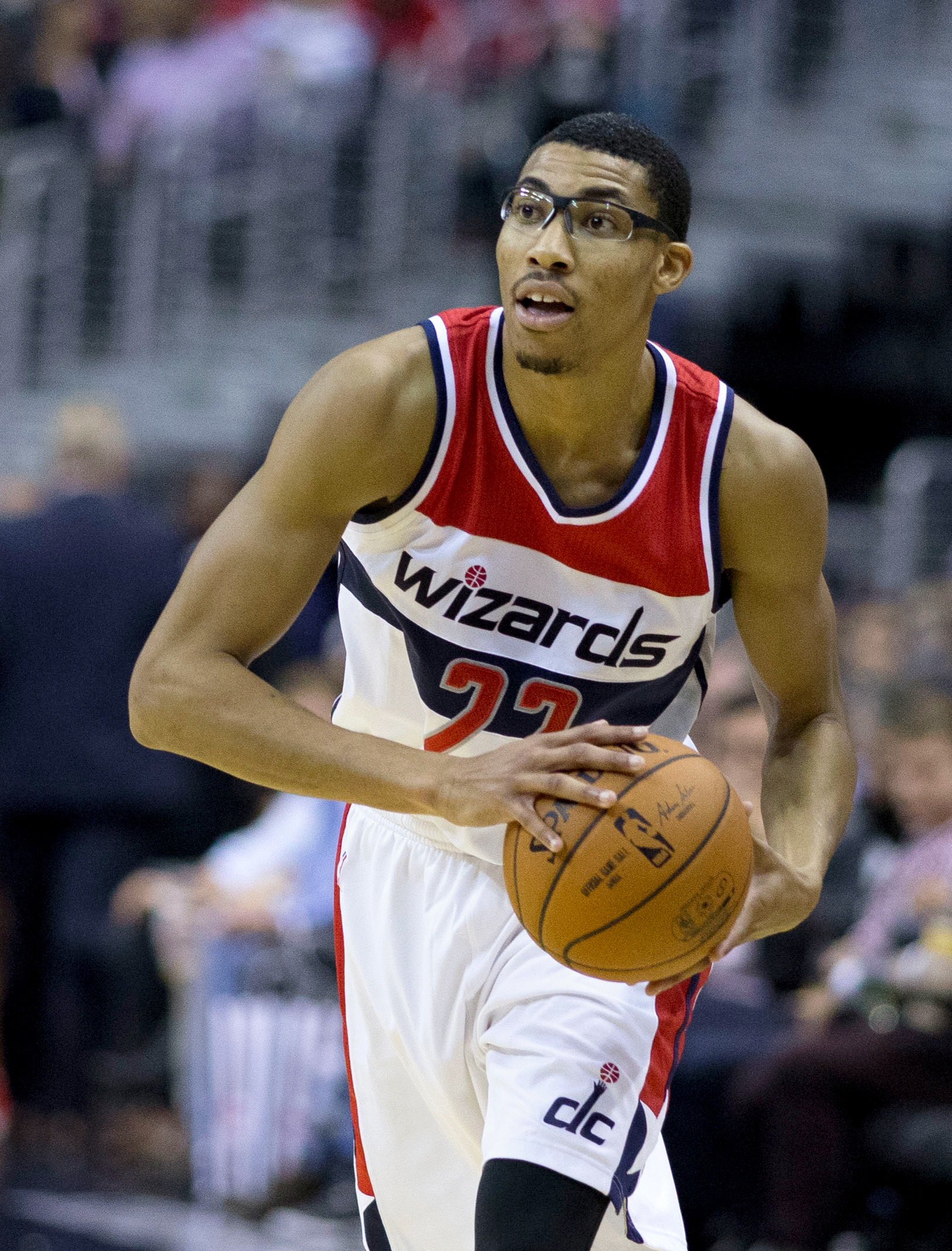
Porter with the Wizards in 2014

Porter was selected with the third overall pick in the 2013 NBA draft by the Washington Wizards. However, he missed training camp and the first 18 games of the 2013–14 season with a hip injury. He made his NBA debut on December 6, going scoreless in 14 minutes in a 109–105 overtime loss to the Milwaukee Bucks. He twice scored a season-high nine points in April 2014. On November 1, 2014, he scored 19 of his career-high 21 points in the second half of the Wizards' 108–97 win over the Bucks. On November 7, 2015, he set a new career high with 23 points in a 114–99 loss to the Atlanta Hawks. On December 12, 2015, he scored a career-high 28 points in a 114–111 win over the Dallas Mavericks.

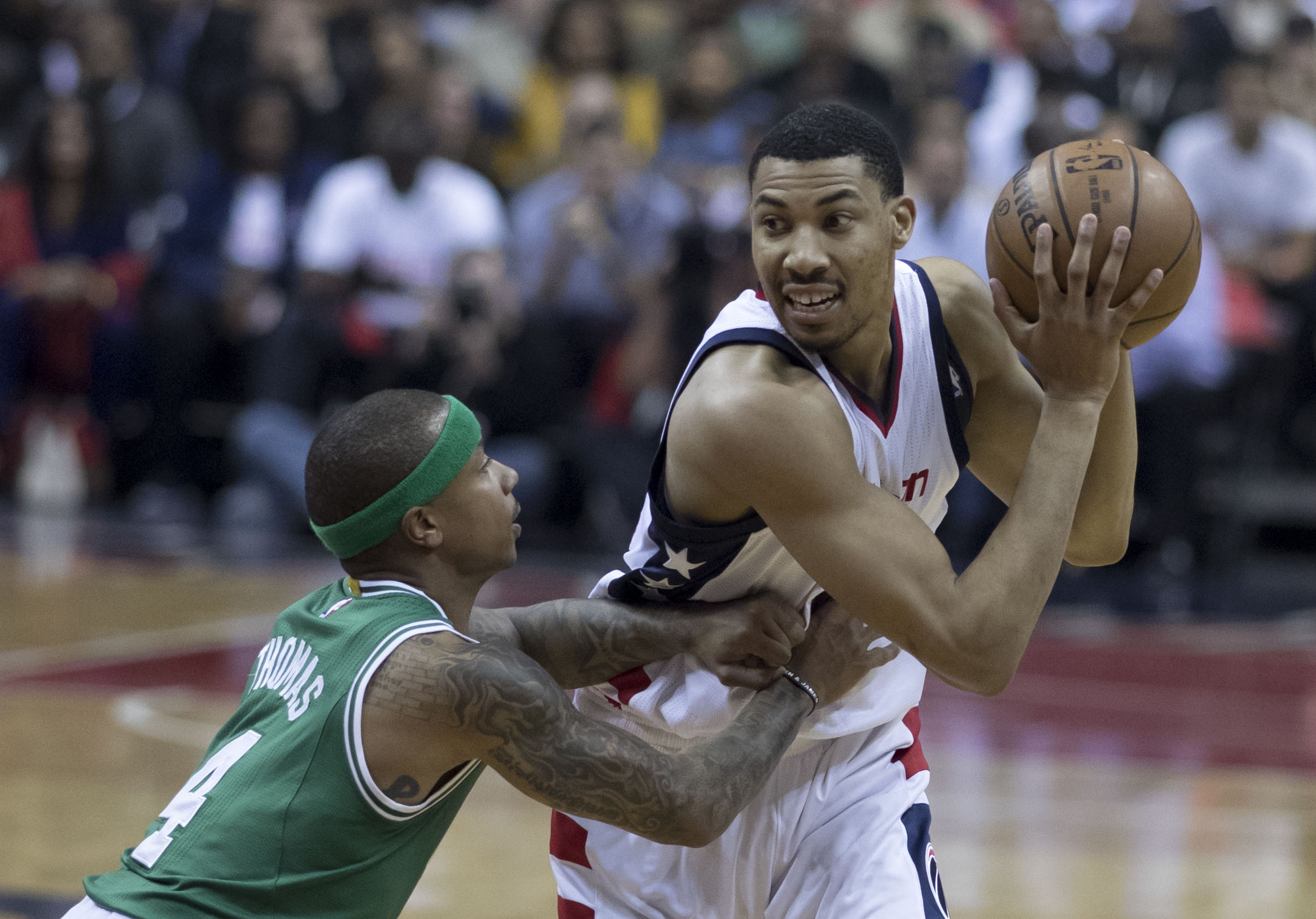
Porter in May 2017

On November 9, 2016, Porter scored a career-high 34 points in a 118–93 win over the Boston Celtics. On December 26, he had 32 points, made a career-high five three-pointers and grabbed 13 rebounds in a 107–102 win over the Milwaukee Bucks. On January 18, he set a new career high with six three-pointers to finish with 25 points in a 104–101 win over the Memphis Grizzlies. He made six three-pointers for the second straight night on January 19, finishing with 23 points in a 113–110 win over the New York Knicks. He started 80 games and set career highs in scoring (13.4 points per game), rebounds (6.4) and steals (1.5) while shooting 51.6 percent from the field and 43.4 percent from three-point range in 2016–17. According to ESPN's Real Plus-Minus, a player's estimated on-court impact on team performance, Porter was the most efficient scorer in the NBA among 115 players with at least 800 possessions, penetrating defenses in transition and as a spot-up shooter. His three-point shooting percentage was fourth best in the NBA.

On July 4, 2017, the Brooklyn Nets offered Porter a four-year, $106.5 million contract, the maximum they could give him. Two days later, the Wizards received the offer sheet, with the goal being to match the offer. On July 13, the Wizards announced that the team had retained its right of first refusal and matched the offer sheet extended to Porter by the Nets. On October 27, he scored 29 points against the Golden State Warriors. On December 29, he matched a career high with seven 3-pointers and had a game-high 26 points in a 121–103 win over the Houston Rockets. On February 28, also against the Warriors, Porter matched his season high with 29 points.

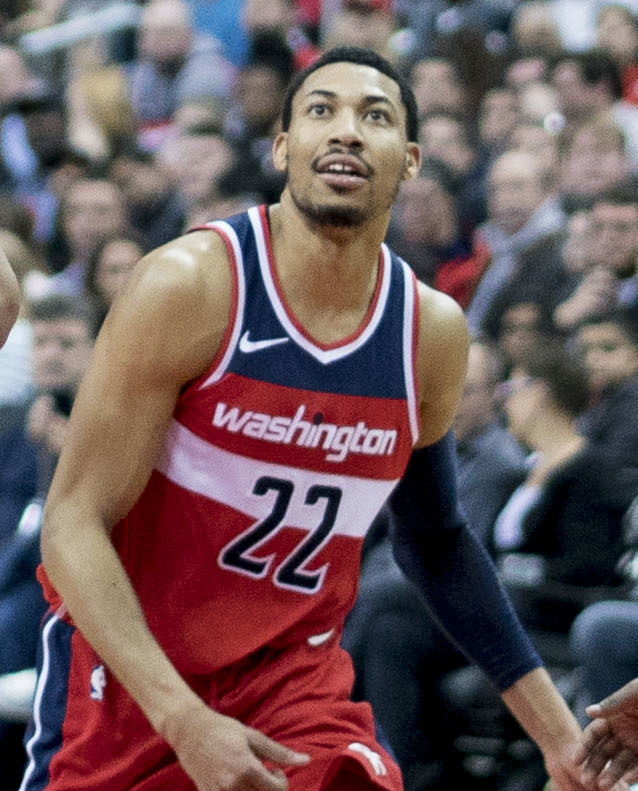
Porter with the Washington Wizards in 2018

On November 24, 2018, Porter scored a season-high 29 points in a 124–114 win over the New Orleans Pelicans. On January 2, he returned to the lineup against the Atlanta Hawks after missing 10 games with a bruised right knee. He came off the bench in 13 straight games upon returning, before starting on January 30 against the Indiana Pacers and injuring his left big toe.

=== Chicago Bulls (2019–2021) ===
On February 6, 2019, Porter was traded to the Chicago Bulls in exchange for Jabari Parker, Bobby Portis and a protected 2023 second-round draft pick. On February 13, he scored a career-high 37 points on 16-for-20 shooting in a 122–110 win over the Memphis Grizzlies.

=== Orlando Magic (2021) ===
On March 25, 2021, Porter and Wendell Carter Jr. were traded to the Orlando Magic in exchange for Nikola Vučević and Al-Farouq Aminu. Orlando also received two future first-round draft picks.

=== Golden State Warriors (2021–2022) ===
On August 6, 2021, Porter signed with the Golden State Warriors on a $2.4 million veteran minimum contract. Porter won an NBA championship when the Warriors defeated the Boston Celtics in 6 games of the 2022 NBA Finals. He played a sizable role in the postseason, starting in Game 6 of the Finals.

=== Toronto Raptors (2022–2024) ===
On July 6, 2022, Porter signed with the Toronto Raptors on a two-year, $12.4 million contract. On January 10, 2023, after playing only eight games in the season, he underwent season-ending surgery on his left foot.

On February 8, 2024, Porter was traded to the Utah Jazz alongside Kira Lewis Jr. and a 2024 first-round draft pick in exchange for Kelly Olynyk and Ochai Agbaji. However, he did not play any games for the Jazz and was waived on March 11, 2024. Afterwards, he announced his retirement from basketball.

== Career statistics ==
Legend
GP	Games played	GS	Games started	MPG	Minutes per game
FG%	Field goal percentage	3P%	3-point field goal percentage	FT%	Free throw percentage
RPG	Rebounds per game	APG	Assists per game	SPG	Steals per game
BPG	Blocks per game	PPG	Points per game	**Bold**	Career high
†	Won an NBA championship

=== NBA ===
==== Regular season ====
Year	Team	GP	GS	MPG	FG%	3P%	FT%	RPG	APG	SPG	BPG	PPG
2013–14	Washington	37	0	8.6	.363	.190	.667	1.5	.3	.2	.0	2.1
2014–15	Washington	74	13	19.4	.450	.337	.734	3.0	.9	.6	.4	6.0
2015–16	Washington	75	73	30.3	.473	.367	.754	5.2	1.6	1.4	.4	11.6
2016–17	Washington	**80**	**80**	32.6	**.516**	.434	.832	**6.4**	1.5	1.5	.5	13.4
2017–18	Washington	77	77	31.6	.503	.441	.828	**6.4**	2.0	1.5	.5	14.7
2018–19	Washington	41	28	29.0	.457	.369	.766	5.6	2.0	**1.6**	.5	12.6
2018–19	Chicago	15	15	**32.8**	.483	**.488**	.906	5.5	**2.7**	1.2	**.6**	**17.5**
2019–20	Chicago	14	9	23.6	.443	.387	.704	3.4	1.8	1.1	.4	11.9
2020–21	Chicago	25	6	21.6	.441	.400	.838	5.5	2.0	.5	.2	9.9
2020–21	Orlando	3	0	22.0	.360	.111	**1.000**	4.7	1.7	1.3	.0	8.0
2021–22†	Golden State	63	15	22.2	.464	.370	.803	5.7	1.5	1.1	.5	8.2
2022–23	Toronto	8	2	18.3	.500	.353	**1.000**	2.4	1.0	1.4	.0	5.5
2023–24	Toronto	15	1	11.6	.424	.348	**1.000**	1.9	.5	.3	.3	2.6
Career		527	319	25.4	.477	.397	.797	4.9	1.5	1.1	.4	10.3

==== Playoffs ====
Year	Team	GP	GS	MPG	FG%	3P%	FT%	RPG	APG	SPG	BPG	PPG
2014	Washington	3	0	2.0	.333	.000	–	.0	.0	.0	.0	.7
2015	Washington	10	0	**33.1**	.443	.375	.476	**8.0**	**1.8**	1.2	.2	10.0
2017	Washington	13	**13**	32.9	**.532**	.282	**.886**	6.9	**1.8**	**1.6**	**.5**	**12.2**
2018	Washington	5	5	31.6	.488	**.417**	.625	5.0	1.6	1.2	1.0	10.0
2022†	Golden State	**19**	3	19.5	.494	.404	.778	3.4	**1.8**	.9	.3	5.4
Career		50	21	25.9	.491	.359	.726	5.2	1.7	1.1	.4	8.2

=== College ===
Year	Team	GP	GS	MPG	FG%	3P%	FT%	RPG	APG	SPG	BPG	PPG
2011–12	Georgetown	**33**	8	29.7	**.525**	.226	.702	6.8	1.5	1.1	.8	9.7
2012–13	Georgetown	31	**30**	**35.4**	.480	**.422**	**.777**	**7.5**	**2.7**	**1.8**	**.9**	**16.2**
Career		64	38	32.5	.498	.355	.751	7.1	2.1	1.5	.9	12.8

== Personal life ==
Porter comes from a family with many accomplishments in basketball. His father, Otto Porter Sr., was part of Scott County Central High School's first title in 1976 and holds the high school record with 1,733 rebounds. His mother, Elnora Porter (née Timmons), helped the same school win the 1984 state championship. His uncles Marcus Timmons and Donnie McClinton won a combined six state championships. Additionally, his uncles Melvin Porter and Jerry Porter, and his younger brother Jeffery Porter, have also won state titles. First cousin Calvin Porter Jr. was one of three Porters to start for the high school's championship team in 2011. His cousin Mark Mosely was the starting point guard for the Braves in 1990 and 1991 when they won state championships. His cousins Corey and Reece Porter helped Sikeston High School win its first state title in its first undefeated season. His cousin Michael Porter, the son of Drury University basketball player Melvin Porter, was a former four-time all-state basketball player for Sikeston High School who later played for Southeast Missouri State University. His cousins Dominique Porter and Jaylen Porter played basketball for the Culver-Stockton Wildcats. His cousin and former teammate Bobby Hatchett played for Midland College, which played for the National Junior College Athletic Association national championship. The Porter family had a member on the Braves' first 11 state championship teams.
