= Mr. Show-Me Basketball =

- Awarded for: The top male high school basketball player in Missouri
- Country: United States
- Presented by: Missouri Basketball Coaches Association
- First award: 1985
- Website: Mr. Show-Me Basketball Website

The Mr. Show-Me Basketball honor recognizes the top male high school basketball player in the state of Missouri. The name of the award differs from other Mr. Basketball awards to reflect Missouri's state nickname, the Show-Me State. The award is presented annually by the Missouri Basketball Coaches Association. In order to be considered for the award, nominees must have been nominated by their high school coach, started in 90 percent of all games, must be high school seniors, and must be of "outstanding moral character". Ten boys are selected as finalists after nominations are compiled, and a special committee of assistant college coaches in Missouri choose the winner.

The first recipient of the honor was Monroe Douglas in 1985, who is the fourth all-time leading scorer for the Saint Louis Billikens men's basketball team in total points with 1,877 points and was named to their all-century team. Two sets of brothers, JarRon and Kareem Rush along with Tyler and Ben Hansbrough, have received the honor. Nine recipients of the Mr. Show-Me Basketball honor have been drafted into the NBA, the highest draft picks being both Bradley Beal in the 2012 NBA draft and Jayson Tatum in the 2017 NBA draft with the 3rd overall pick. Other recipients of the honor have played with professional teams in Europe and Asia including Michael Dixon, who played for the Georgia national basketball team in the EuroBasket 2017 qualification tournament. Many recipients have also pursued coaching opportunities in high schools and colleges.

== Winners ==
Year	Image	Player	High School	College	Notes	Refs
1985	–	Monroe Douglas	McKinley	Saint Louis	Voted onto the Saint Louis Billikens men's all-century basketball team in 2015	
1986	Anthony Bonner is wearing a black athletic shirt while visiting the Hatzerim Air Force Base in 2010	Anthony Bonner	Vashon	Saint Louis	Graduated as Saint Louis' all-time leading scorer and his #34 jersey has been honored by the program; selected by the Sacramento Kings in the first round (23rd overall pick) of the 1990 NBA draft, played six seasons in the NBA for the Sacramento Kings, New York Knicks, and Orlando Magic, and also played overseas in Italy, Turkey, Spain, and Russia; currently head basketball coach at Aubrey Rogers High School in Naples, Florida	
1987	–	John Cooper	Rockhurst	Wichita State	Assistant basketball coach for Oklahoma State University (2017–present) and former head basketball coach for Miami University (2012–2017) and Tennessee State University (2009–2012)	
1988	–	Anthony Peeler	Paseo	Missouri	Voted onto Mizzou's all-century basketball team in 2005; selected by the Los Angeles Lakers in the first round (15th overall pick) of the 1992 NBA draft, played 13 seasons in the NBA for the Los Angeles Lakers, Vancouver Grizzlies, Minnesota Timberwolves, Sacramento Kings, and Washington Wizards	
1989	–	Chris Heller	Rockhurst	Missouri	Inducted into the Rockhurst High School Hall of Fame in 2014	
1990	–	Jevon Crudup	Raytown South	Missouri	Selected by the Detroit Pistons in the second round (48th overall pick) of the 1994 NBA Draft, played for the Pop Cola Panthers of the Philippine Basketball Association; former assistant basketball coach for Raytown South High School, fired in 2003 and sued Raytown C-2 School District for racial discrimination, which ruled in favor of Crudup and ordered the district to pay $250,000 in punitive damages	
1991	–	Marcus Timmons	Scott County Central	SIU Carbondale	Voted onto the Southern Illinois Salukis men's all-century basketball team in 2014, played for several Australian National Basketball League teams	
1992	–	Brian Gavin	Parkway Central	Kansas State	Head basketball coach for Bishop Ward High School	
1993	–	Kelly Thames	Jennings	Missouri	Head basketball coach for Pattonville High School; son Kellen Thames currently plays collegiately at Saint Louis	
1994	–	Monte Hardge	Jefferson City	Missouri	Became academically ineligible to play for the Missouri Tigers men's basketball team for three semesters and utilized a medical redshirt during his freshman year	
1995	–	Ryan Robertson	St. Charles West	Kansas	Selected by the Sacramento Kings in the second round (45th overall pick) of the 1999 NBA draft, played in the NBA for the Sacramento Kings (1999–2000) and for several teams in Europe	
1996	–	Tate Decker	Webster Groves	Missouri, Wake Forest, and Oklahoma City	Played for numerous teams across Europe and Asia including in Spain, Latvia, Portugal, Japan, and Germany	
1997	Larry Hughes with the Cavaliers in April 2007 dribbling a ball	Larry Hughes	Christian Brothers College (CBC)	Saint Louis	Selected by the Philadelphia 76ers in the first round (8th overall pick) of the 1998 NBA Draft, played in the NBA for the Philadelphia 76ers, Golden State Warriors, Washington Wizards, Cleveland Cavaliers, Chicago Bulls, New York Knicks, Sacramento Kings, Charlotte Bobcats, and Orlando Magic; son Larry Hughes II currently plays college basketball at Sacramento State having previously played at Saint Louis and Cal State Northridge	
1998	–	JaRon Rush	Pembroke Hill	UCLA	Played in the ABA for the Los Angeles Stars and in the National Basketball Development League for the Roanoke Dazzle	
1999	Kareem Rush is wearing a L.A. Clippers tank top in 2009	Kareem Rush	Pembroke Hill	Missouri	Selected by the Toronto Raptors in the first round (20th overall pick) of the 2002 NBA draft, played in the NBA for the Los Angeles Lakers, Charlotte Bobcats, Indiana Pacers, Philadelphia 76ers, and Los Angeles Clippers	
2000	–	Joel Shelton	Vashon	SEMO	Left the Southeast Missouri State Redhawks men's basketball team his sophomore year for personal reasons	
2001	David Lee is with the Golden State Warriors in air with a ball in hand	David Lee	Chaminade	Florida	Selected by the New York Knicks in the first round (30th overall pick) of the 2005 NBA draft, played 12 seasons in the NBA for the New York Knicks, Golden State Warriors, Boston Celtics, Dallas Mavericks, and San Antonio Spurs	
2002	Jimmy McKinney is shooting a 3-pointer for a team in Germany	Jimmy McKinney	Vashon	Missouri	Played in the Basketball Bundesliga for several teams in Germany including the Skyliners Frankfurt and Telekom Baskets Bonn; named head basketball coach at Vashon ahead of 2024-25 season	
2003	–	Spencer Laurie	Kickapoo	Missouri and Missouri State	Granted an additional season of eligibility under an NCAA waiver after an injury and personal circumstances during and following his second season at the University of Missouri	
2004	–	Drew Richards	Logan-Rogersville	Missouri State	Assistant basketball coach for Cameron University	
2005	Tyler Hansbrough is wearing a North Carolina jersey on the court	Tyler Hansbrough	Poplar Bluff	North Carolina	Selected by the Indiana Pacers in the first round (13th overall pick) of the 2009 NBA draft, played seven seasons in the NBA for the Indiana Pacers, Toronto Raptors, and Charlotte Hornets and in the Chinese Basketball Association for the Guangzhou Long-Lions	
2006	–	Ben Hansbrough	Poplar Bluff	Mississippi State and Notre Dame	Former assistant basketball coach for Western Kentucky University	
2007	–	Conner Teahan	Rockhurst	Kansas	–	
2008	Scott Suggs is shooting the ball for the Washington Huskies	Scott Suggs	Washington	Washington	Played with several European teams including in Spain for Bàsquet Manresa, in Italy for New Basket Brindisi, and in Greece for G.S. Iraklis B.C.	
2009	Michael Dixon is dribbling the ball for the Memphis Tigers at the NCAA Tournament in Raleigh	Michael Dixon	Lee's Summit West	Missouri and Memphis	Played for multiple teams overseas including in Lithuania, the Czech Republic, Greece, France, Turkey, Tunisia, and Rwanda; member of the Georgia national basketball team as a naturalized citizen	
2010	–	Ricky Kreklow	Rock Bridge	Missouri and California, Berkeley	Played for the Bayer Giants Leverkusen basketball team in Germany	
2011	Bradley Beal is playing for the Washington Wizards dribbling a ball down the court	Bradley Beal	Chaminade	Florida	Selected by the Washington Wizards in the first round (3rd overall pick) of the 2012 NBA draft, currently playing in the NBA for the Phoenix Suns.	
2012	–	Cameron Biedscheid	Cardinal Ritter	Notre Dame, Missouri, Jacksonville State, LSU Shreveport, and Harris–Stowe	Multiple reasons led to the dismissal of Biedscheid from the Louisiana State University Shreveport men's basketball team including suffering a high ankle sprain, missing a team bus trip, and missing rehab and practice	
2013	–	Kyle Wolf	Rockhurst	Central Missouri	–	
2014	–	Jordan Barnett	Christian Brothers College (CBC)	Texas and Missouri	Currently playing for Soproni KC in Hungary and previously played for the SC Rasta Vechta and Gießen 46ers basketball teams in Germany	
2015	–	Jimmy Whitt	Hickman	Arkansas and SMU	–	
2016	Jayson Tatum is dribbling at the All-American game in 2016	Jayson Tatum	Chaminade	Duke	Selected by the Boston Celtics in the first round (3rd overall pick) of the 2017 NBA draft, currently playing in the NBA for the Boston Celtics; also won Gatorade National Player of the Year honors for 2016	
2017	–	Jared Ridder	Kickapoo	Xavier and Missouri State	–	
2018	Courtney Ramey is posing in a Texas Longhorns Basketball sweatshirt	Courtney Ramey	Webster Groves	Texas and Arizona	Currently playing for Start Lublin of the Polish Basketball League and has also played in the German Basketball Bundesliga and Lithuanian Basketball League	
2019	–	Isiaih Mosley	Rock Bridge	Missouri State and Missouri	Currently playing professionally in the Kosovo Superleague after stints with several NBA G League teams	
2020	Caleb Love is mid-air after shooting a shot	Caleb Love	Christian Brothers College (CBC)	North Carolina and Arizona	Currently playing for the Portland Trail Blazers of the NBA and Rip City Remix of the NBA G League on a two-way contract	
2021	Mohammed with Georgetown in 2021	Aminu Mohammed	Greenwood	Georgetown	Currently playing for the Delaware Blue Coats of the NBA G League	
2022	–	Luke Northweather	Blair Oaks	Oklahoma and Missouri	–	
2023	–	Kyan Evans	Staley	Colorado State, North Carolina, and Minnesota	–	
2024	–	Jadis Jones	New Madrid County Central	Lindenwood and USC	–	
2025	–	Corbin Allen	Oak Park	Kansas and App State	–	
2026	–	Quentin Coleman	The Principia	Illinois	–	

== Schools with multiple winners ==
School	Number of Awards	Years
Rockhurst	4	1987, 1989, 2007, 2013
Vashon	3	1986, 2000, 2002
Christian Brothers College (CBC)	3	1997, 2014, 2020
Chaminade	3	2001, 2011, 2016
Rock Bridge	2	2010, 2019
Poplar Bluff	2	2005, 2006
Pembroke Hill	2	1998, 1999
Kickapoo	2	2003, 2017

== See also ==
- Miss Show-Me Basketball
- Mr. Basketball USA
