= Scott County Central Schools =

School district in Missouri, U.S.

Scott County Central School District is a school district in Scott County, Missouri. Communities in its boundary include Haywood City, Morley, and Vanduser. It operates Scott County Central Elementary School and Scott County Central High School.

== History ==
It was initially known as the Scott County Reorganized School District 5 a.k.a. the Morley-Vanduser School District. It was created in 1954 as the result of a referendum. This was one of five school district organization referendums in the county at the same time, and three of the others were successful.

In 1955 there was an attempt to consolidate this district and the Scott County R-4 School District, but this was voted down.

Initially Morley and Vanduser were to have their own elementary schools. The consolidated high school opened in 1959. In 1973, a new elementary school opened. This elementary school replaced the ones in Morley and Vanduser.

Howard Benyon was superintendent until 2019, when he took an administrative position in the Cape Girardeau School District.
