= 2022 NBA Finals =

North America basketball championship

Team	Coach	Wins
Golden State Warriors	Steve Kerr	4
Boston Celtics	Ime Udoka	2
- Dates: June 2–16
- MVP: Stephen Curry (Golden State Warriors)
- Eastern finals: Celtics defeated Heat, 4–3
- Western finals: Warriors defeated Mavericks, 4–1

The 2022 NBA Finals was the championship series of the National Basketball Association's (NBA) 2021–22 season and conclusion of the season's playoffs. In this best-of-seven playoff series, the Western Conference champion Golden State Warriors defeated the Eastern Conference champion Boston Celtics in six games, winning their fourth championship in eight years. Golden State's Stephen Curry was named the Finals Most Valuable Player (MVP) for the first time in his career.

The Warriors were the no. 3 seed in the West, while the Celtics were the no. 2 in the East. Despite this, the Warriors had home-court advantage for finishing the regular season 2 games better than the Celtics. The Celtics won the opening game on the road and returned to Boston with the series tied 1–1. They won their first home game to take a 2–1 lead, but the Warriors won the next three games to take the series 4–2. Golden State won its first title since 2018 and its seventh championship overall, while Boston, with 17 championships, remained tied with the Los Angeles Lakers for the most titles in league history. By winning their 18th title in 2024, the Celtics were able to break this record.

The NBA Finals returned to its normal June schedule for the first time since 2019, before the COVID-19 pandemic began. The series started on June 2 and concluded on June 16. This edition of the Finals was a rematch of the 1964 NBA Finals, in which the Celtics defeated the then-San Francisco Warriors in five games.

== Background ==
This was the second Finals meeting between the Celtics and the Warriors, after 1964, where the Celtics defeated the Warriors (then the San Francisco Warriors) in five games to win their sixth consecutive title.

In the playoffs, from the first round until the conference finals, home-court advantage was given to a team with the higher seed. However, in the NBA Finals, this is given to the team with a better regular-season record, regardless of the seedings. The Warriors were the no. 3 seed in the West, while the Celtics were no. 2 in the East. The Warriors and the Celtics finished the regular season 53–29 and 51–31, respectively, giving the Warriors home-court advantage over the Celtics. This was the 11th time that a lower-seeded team had home-court advantage, the last time being 2019. It was also the second straight finals without a no. 1 seed from either conference (after 2021), and the 15th time overall.

=== Boston Celtics ===
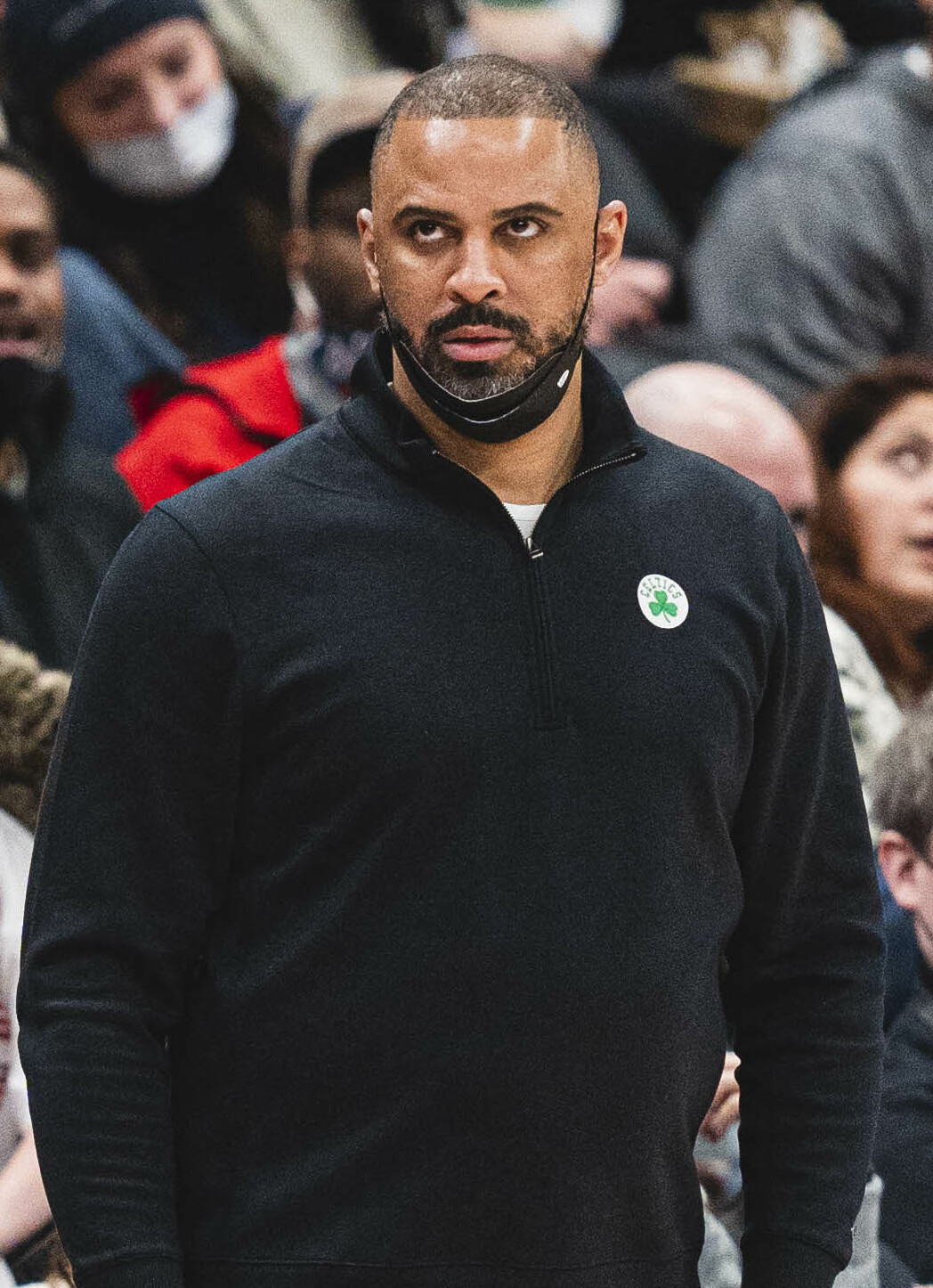
In his first year as head coach, Ime Udoka took the Celtics to their first NBA Finals in 12 years.

During the 2021 offseason, the Celtics named head coach Brad Stevens president of basketball operations, replacing Danny Ainge after he announced his retirement. Stevens made his first transaction in his new position trading away Kemba Walker, a 2021 first-round pick, and a 2025 second-round pick in exchange for Al Horford, Moses Brown, and a 2023 second-round pick. Needing a replacement for Stevens, Brooklyn Nets assistant coach Ime Udoka was hired as the new head coach. After starting the season 16–19 and in 10th place in the Eastern Conference standings, the Celtics finished the regular season with a record of 51–31, winning 35 of their final 47 games to finish with the second-best record in the conference.

In the first round of the playoffs, the Celtics won in a four-game sweep over the seventh-seeded Brooklyn Nets, with numerous experts expecting a more competitive series as the Nets, with Kevin Durant, Kyrie Irving and initially James Harden before he was traded to the Philadelphia 76ers, were seen as the preseason favorites. The Celtics then faced the 2021 Finals MVP Giannis Antetokounmpo and defending champion Milwaukee Bucks, going down 3–2 in the series before eventually winning the series in seven games. After going down 2–1 in the conference finals against the first-seeded Miami Heat led by Jimmy Butler, the Celtics won in seven games, reaching the Finals for the first time since 2010 and for the 22nd time in their history.

=== Golden State Warriors ===
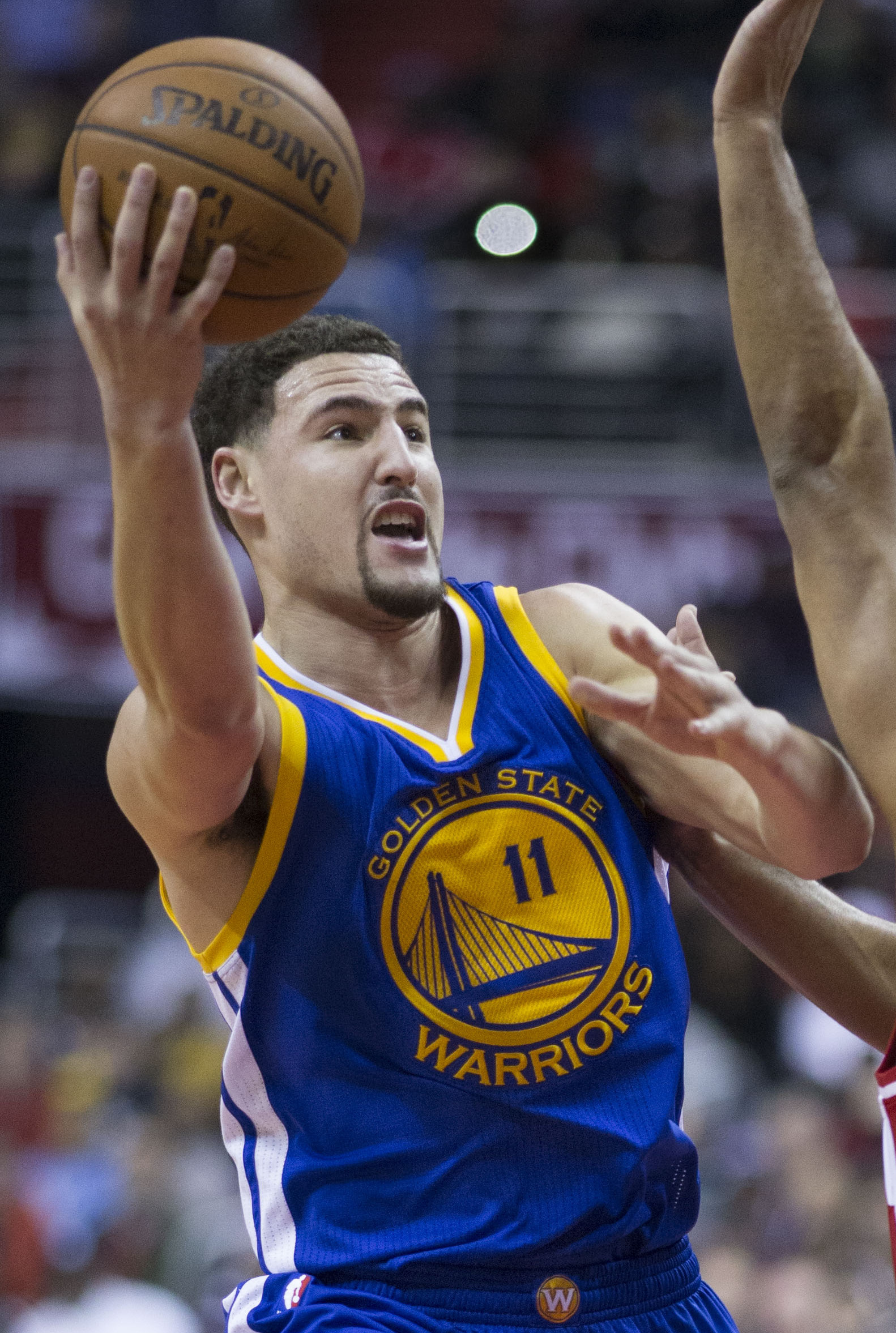
Klay Thompson returned after missing the previous two seasons because of injury.

After reaching the Finals for five consecutive seasons (2015–2019), the Warriors were struck with injuries for the next two seasons, with Klay Thompson sitting out for both the 2020 and 2021 seasons, and Stephen Curry playing a combined 68 games during that time span. In 2021–22, Golden State began the season winning 18 of their first 20 games. Curry became the NBA career leader in 3-pointers, and Thompson returned on January 9, 2022, his first NBA game in 941 days. Andrew Wiggins, acquired by the Warriors in 2020 after six seasons with Minnesota, was named a starter for the 2022 NBA All-Star Game. The Warriors finished as the No. 3 seed in the Western Conference with a record of 53–29.

In the first round of the playoffs, the Warriors got past the sixth-seeded Denver Nuggets and 2022 league MVP Nikola Jokić in five games, with Curry coming off the bench in four of the five games after he returned from a foot injury. The Warriors then eliminated the second-seeded Memphis Grizzlies and the 2022 NBA Most Improved Player, Ja Morant, beating them in six games. After defeating the Dallas Mavericks in five games in the conference finals, the Warriors advanced to the Finals for the first time in three seasons, the sixth time in eight seasons, and the twelfth time in franchise history.

=== Road to the Finals ===
Eastern Conference
#	Team	W	L	PCT	GB	GP
1	c – Miami Heat *	53	29	.646	–	82
2	y – Boston Celtics *	51	31	.622	2.0	82
3	y – Milwaukee Bucks *	51	31	.622	2.0	82
4	x – Philadelphia 76ers	51	31	.622	2.0	82
5	x – Toronto Raptors	48	34	.585	5.0	82
6	x – Chicago Bulls	46	36	.561	7.0	82
7	x − Brooklyn Nets	44	38	.537	9.0	82
8	pi − Cleveland Cavaliers	44	38	.537	9.0	82
9	x − Atlanta Hawks	43	39	.524	10.0	82
10	pi − Charlotte Hornets	43	39	.524	10.0	82
11	New York Knicks	37	45	.451	16.0	82
12	Washington Wizards	35	47	.427	18.0	82
13	Indiana Pacers	25	57	.305	28.0	82
14	Detroit Pistons	23	59	.280	30.0	82
15	Orlando Magic	22	60	.268	31.0	82

Western Conference
#	Team	W	L	PCT	GB	GP
1	z – Phoenix Suns *	64	18	.780	–	82
2	y – Memphis Grizzlies *	56	26	.683	8.0	82
3	x – Golden State Warriors	53	29	.646	11.0	82
4	x – Dallas Mavericks	52	30	.634	12.0	82
5	y – Utah Jazz *	49	33	.598	15.0	82
6	x – Denver Nuggets	48	34	.585	16.0	82
7	x – Minnesota Timberwolves	46	36	.561	18.0	82
8	pi – Los Angeles Clippers	42	40	.512	22.0	82
9	x – New Orleans Pelicans	36	46	.439	28.0	82
10	pi − San Antonio Spurs	34	48	.415	30.0	82
11	Los Angeles Lakers	33	49	.402	31.0	82
12	Sacramento Kings	30	52	.366	34.0	82
13	Portland Trail Blazers	27	55	.329	37.0	82
14	Oklahoma City Thunder	24	58	.293	40.0	82
15	Houston Rockets	20	62	.244	44.0	82

Notes

- z – Clinched home court advantage for the entire playoffs
- c – Clinched home court advantage for the conference playoffs
- y – Clinched division title
- x – Clinched playoff spot
- pi – Clinched play-in tournament spot
- * – Division leader

Playoff results
Boston Celtics (Eastern Conference champion)		Golden State Warriors (Western Conference champion)
Defeated the 7th seeded Brooklyn Nets, 4–0	First round	Defeated the 6th seeded Denver Nuggets, 4–1
Defeated the 3rd seeded Milwaukee Bucks, 4–3	Conference semifinals	Defeated the 2nd seeded Memphis Grizzlies, 4–2
Defeated the 1st seeded Miami Heat, 4–3	Conference finals	Defeated the 4th seeded Dallas Mavericks, 4–1

=== Regular season series ===
The Warriors and Celtics tied the regular season series 1–1, with the away team winning each game.

December 17, 2021

Recap

Golden State Warriors 111, Boston Celtics 107

TD Garden, Boston, MA

March 16, 2022

Recap

Boston Celtics 110, Golden State Warriors 88

Chase Center, San Francisco, CA

The Warriors improved to 7–0 in the season with their first win against Boston on December 17, 2021, but there was controversy during their second match-up on March 16, 2022, at the Chase Center. Marcus Smart dove for a loose ball and landed on Stephen Curry's left foot, causing a sprained ligament in the foot. The Celtics routed the Warriors in the game, which was in the midst of the second half of the season surge. Warriors coach Steve Kerr called out Smart for carelessly diving out Curry's legs after the game. Curry missed the remaining 12 games of the regular season, but returned coming off the bench in Game 1 of their first round match-up against the Nuggets.

== Series summary ==
Game	Date	Road team	Result	Home team
Game 1	June 2	Boston Celtics	120–108 (1–0)	Golden State Warriors
Game 2	June 5	Boston Celtics	88–107 (1–1)	Golden State Warriors
Game 3	June 8	Golden State Warriors	100–116 (1–2)	Boston Celtics
Game 4	June 10	Golden State Warriors	107–97 (2–2)	Boston Celtics
Game 5	June 13	Boston Celtics	94–104 (2–3)	Golden State Warriors
Game 6	June 16	Golden State Warriors	103–90 (4–2)	Boston Celtics

== Game summaries ==
Note: Times are EDT (UTC−4) as listed by the NBA. For games in San Francisco, the local time is also given (PDT, UTC−7).

=== Game 1 ===
ABC

June 2
9:00 pm (6:00 pm PDT)

Recap

Boston Celtics 120, Golden State Warriors 108
Scoring by quarter: 28–32, 28–22, 24–38, 40–16
Pts: Al Horford 26; Rebs: Jaylen Brown 7 Asts: Jayson Tatum 13	Pts: Stephen Curry 34; Rebs: Draymond Green 11; Asts: Curry, Green, Looney 5 each
Boston leads series, 1–0

Chase Center, San Francisco, California
Attendance: 18,064
Referees:
- No. 8 Marc Davis
- No. 10 John Goble
- No. 60 James Williams

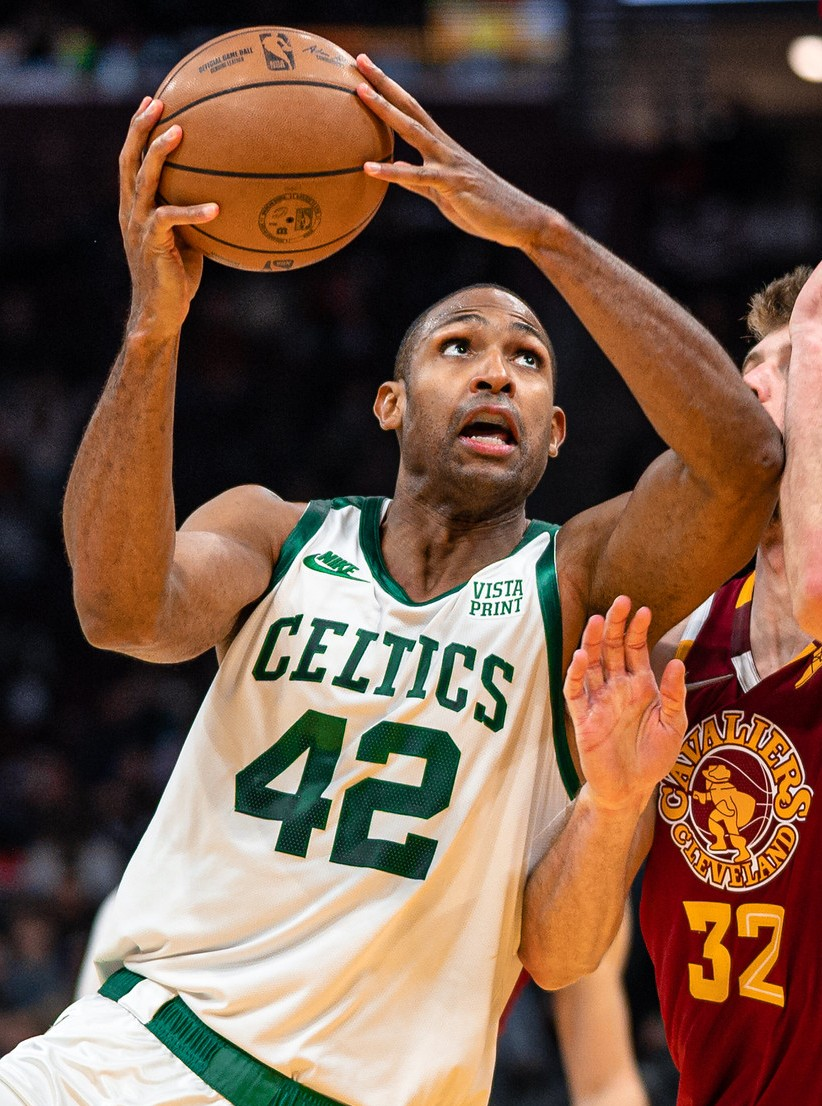
Al Horford led the Celtics with 26 points in his Finals debut, going 4-for-4 in the fourth quarter.

After playing 141 playoff games without an NBA Finals appearance, Al Horford helped lead the way for Boston with 26 points, including going on an 8–0 run by himself to give his team the lead in the fourth quarter as the Celtics outscored the Warriors 40–16. Jaylen Brown also helped spark a 17–0 run in the fourth, scoring 10 of his 24 points in the final quarter. Jayson Tatum had a poor shooting performance, going 3-for-17 from the field and scoring 12 points, but he finished with a career-high 13 assists, the most ever for a player in his Finals debut. Boston's other four starters shot 30-for-50 (60%) in the game, along with shooting 12-for-23 (52%) from beyond the arc, as the Celtics hit their first seven three-point attempts in the fourth. Marcus Smart added 18 points, and Derrick White came off the bench to score 21 points.

For the Warriors, Stephen Curry got off to a hot start, scoring 21 points and shooting 6-for-8 from beyond the arc in the first quarter, the most three-pointers made in a single quarter in Finals history. In addition, the 21 points were the most in a single quarter since Michael Jordan's 22 in the fourth quarter of Game 4 in 1993. But Curry struggled for the rest of the game, shooting 5-of-16 in the final three quarters as the Warriors blew a 92–80 lead heading into the fourth quarter. Despite collecting 11 rebounds, Draymond Green shot just 2-for-12 from the field and 0-for-3 on free throws, fouling out with a minute to go in the fourth.

The Celtics' comeback was the biggest in the Finals after three quarters since the Chicago Bulls overcame a 15-point deficit to beat the Portland Trail Blazers in Game 6 in 1992. The win also brought the Celtics' record to 8–2 on the road this postseason, while the Warriors dropped to 9–1 at home. Both teams made a combined 40 three-pointers, the most ever in an NBA Finals game, surpassing the previous record of 35 set in 2017.

=== Game 2 ===
ABC

June 5
8:00 pm (5:00 pm PDT)

Recap

Boston Celtics 88, Golden State Warriors 107
Scoring by quarter: 30–31, 20–21, 14–35, 24–20
Pts: Jayson Tatum 28; Rebs: Al Horford 8 Asts: Marcus Smart 5	Pts: Stephen Curry 29; Rebs: Kevon Looney 7 Asts: Draymond Green 7
Series tied, 1–1

Chase Center, San Francisco, California
Attendance: 18,064
Referees:
- No. 15 Zach Zarba
- No. 25 Tony Brothers
- No. 58 Josh Tiven

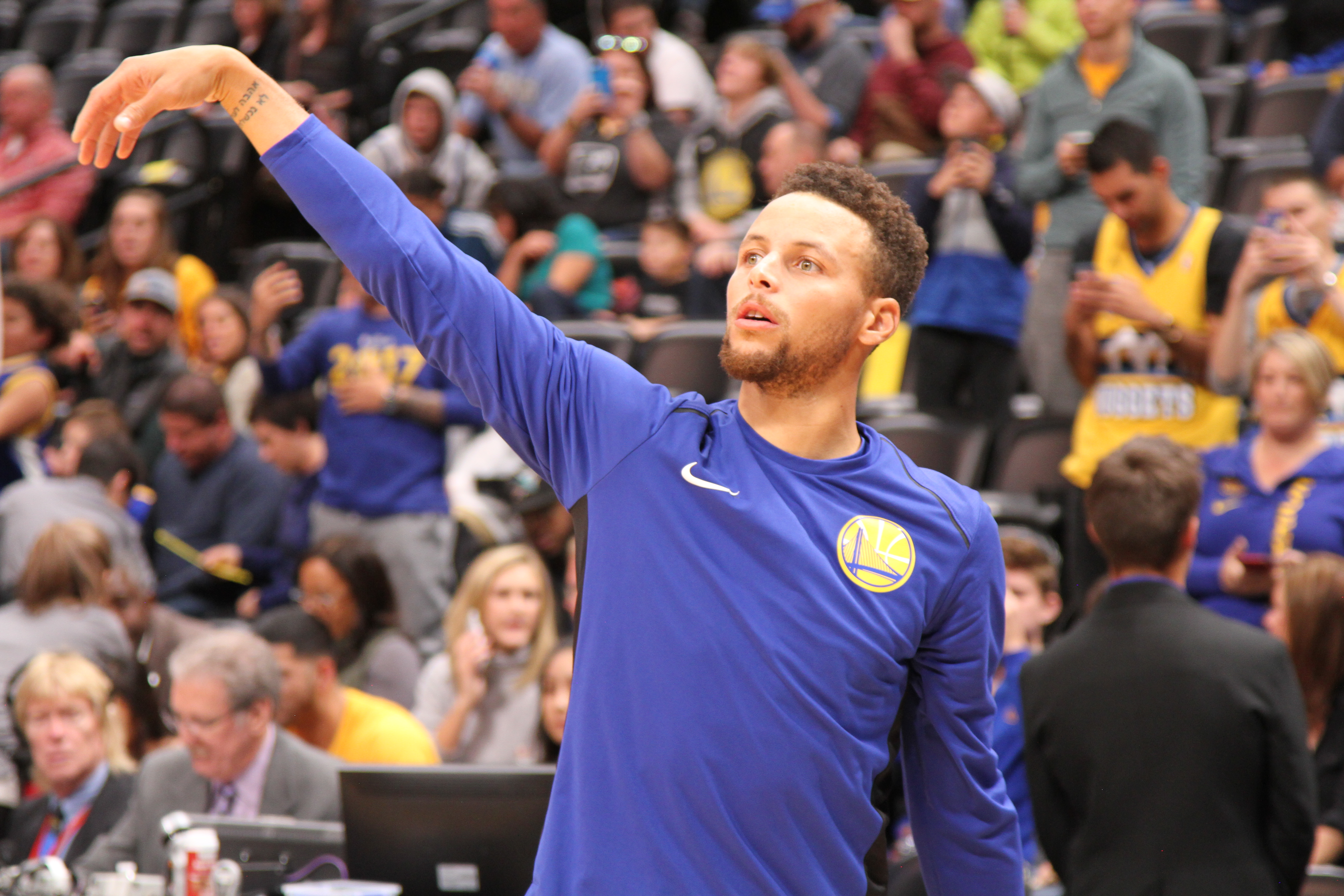
Stephen Curry scored a game-high 29 points for the Warriors in Game 2.

Curry scored 29 points and Golden State outscored Boston 35–14 in the third quarter to tie the series with a 107–88 win. The Warriors outscored the Celtics 43–14 from late in the second quarter to early in the fourth, transforming a tied game into a blowout. Jordan Poole added 17 points for Golden State, including a 3-point shot from 39 feet (12 m), just past midcourt, with only seconds left in the third quarter, giving them a 23-point lead. Boston committed 19 turnovers, which the Warriors converted into 33 points.

Green had nine points, five rebounds, and seven assists for Golden State, but impacted the game with his aggressiveness on defense and physical play. He forced a jump ball on Horford 13 seconds into the game, and was the primary defender on Brown, holding him to 5-of-17 shooting. Tatum recovered from his poor shooting in Game 1, scoring 21 points in the first half of Game 2 on 7-of-16 shooting. Brown added 15 points in the first half, but Boston still trailed by two at halftime. In the third quarter, Tatum shot just twice in the third period, even though he played all 12 minutes. Horford scored just two points on four shots in the game after scoring 26 in the opener. The Celtics made just 37.5% of their shots in the game, scoring their fewest points since December 29, when they were 16–19.

The Warriors' Andre Iguodala missed the game due to inflammation in his right knee. Teammate Gary Payton II, who played for the first time since fracturing his elbow one month earlier in the series against Memphis, scored seven points in 25 minutes.

=== Game 3 ===
ABC

June 8
9:00 pm

Recap

Golden State Warriors 100, Boston Celtics 116
Scoring by quarter: 22–33, 34–35, 33–25, 11–23
Pts: Stephen Curry 31; Rebs: Looney, Wiggins 7 each Asts: Otto Porter Jr. 4	Pts: Jaylen Brown 27; Rebs: Robert Williams III 10; Asts: Jayson Tatum 9
Boston leads series, 2–1

TD Garden, Boston, Massachusetts
Attendance: 19,156
Referees:
- No. 48 Scott Foster
- No. 16 David Guthrie
- No. 61 Courtney Kirkland

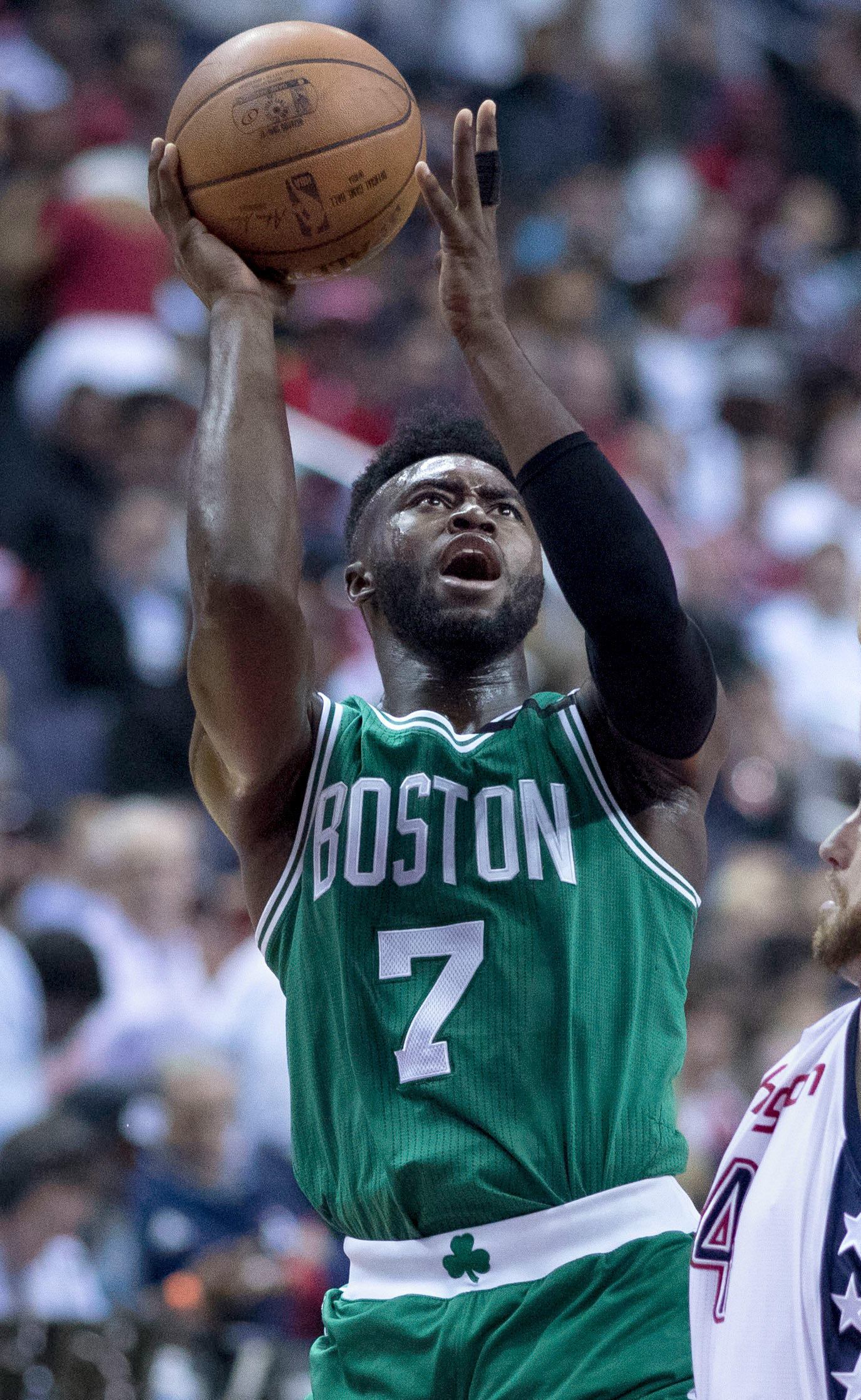
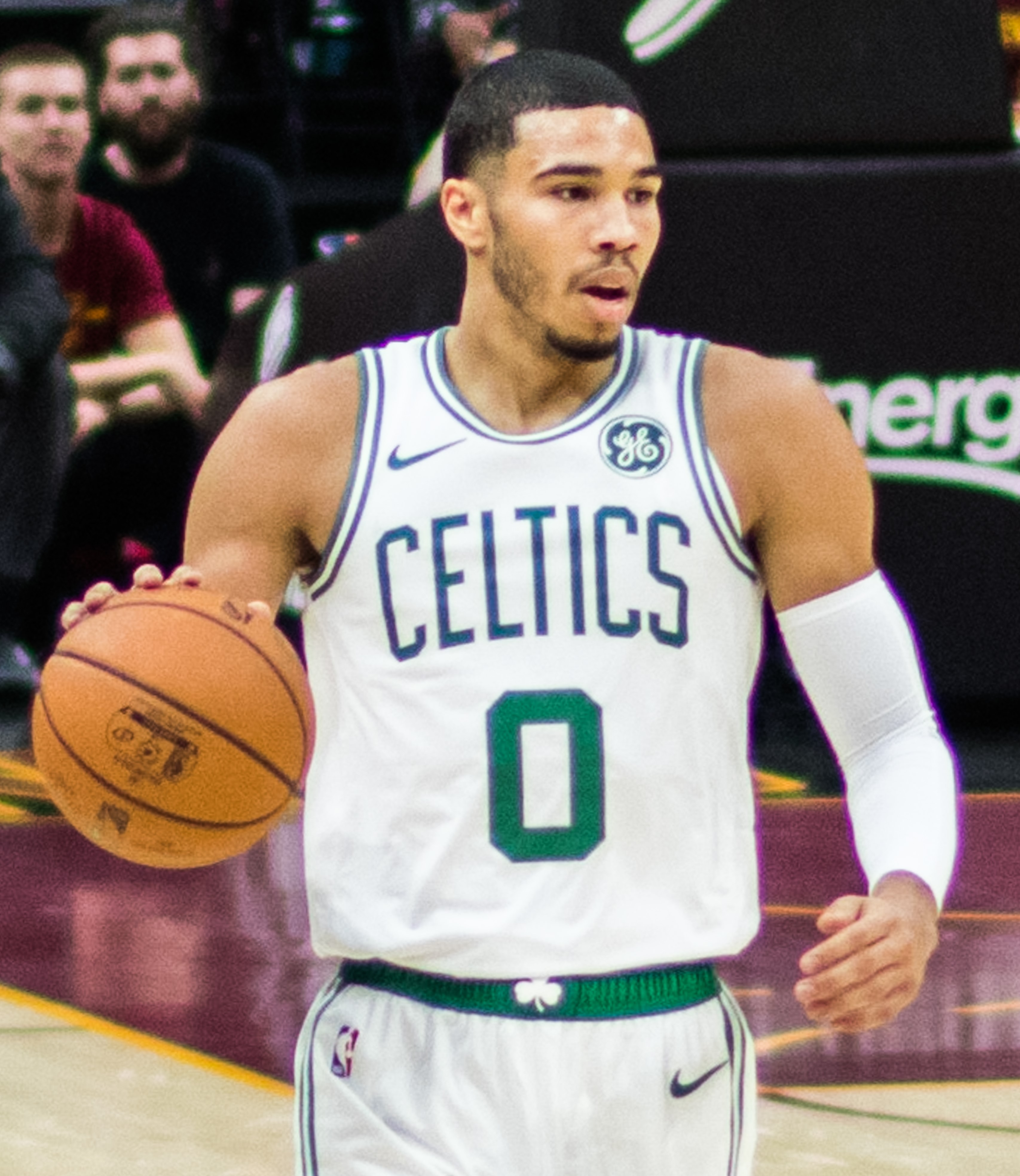
Jaylen Brown (left) and Jayson Tatum (right) combined for 53 points, with Tatum scoring 15 of his 26 in the second half.

Brown scored 27 points and Tatum had 26 in a 116–100 Boston win for a 2–1 series lead. The Celtics led by as many as 18 points in the first half, but Golden State again surged in the third quarter, outscoring Boston 33–25 behind 15 points from Curry. The Warriors briefly took the lead at 83–82, but the Celtics were back up at 93–89 at the end of the period. Boston outscored Golden State 23–11 in the fourth quarter. The Celtics were the more physical team, outscoring the Warriors 52–26 in the paint and outrebounding them 47–31. Boston's Robert Williams III had 10 rebounds and four of the team's seven blocks.

Curry finished with 31 points and six 3-pointers, and Thompson added 25 points and five 3s. Green was held to two points, four rebounds, and three assists before fouling out for the second time in the series. He became the first player in Finals history to foul out after playing at least 34 minutes with less than five points, five rebounds and five assists. Curry was injured late in the fourth when Horford fell on his leg while chasing a loose ball. Green received his sixth foul, which ejected him from the game when he pushed a Celtic from the pile; Green said Curry was howling in pain at the bottom of the pileup. The following day, Curry was confident that he would play in Game 4, saying it was "just a pain tolerance thing that you've got to deal with". He said it was not as bad as the injury that kept him out for the final 12 games of the regular season when Boston's Smart rolled over his foot when they went for a loose ball.

=== Game 4 ===
ABC

June 10
9:00 pm

Recap

Golden State Warriors 107, Boston Celtics 97
Scoring by quarter: 27–28, 22–26, 30–24, 28–19
Pts: Stephen Curry 43; Rebs: Andrew Wiggins 16; Asts: Draymond Green 8	Pts: Jayson Tatum 23; Rebs: Robert Williams III 12; Asts: Jayson Tatum 6
Series tied 2–2

TD Garden, Boston, Massachusetts
Attendance: 19,156
Referees:
- No. 19 James Capers
- No. 5 Kane Fitzgerald
- No. 42 Eric Lewis

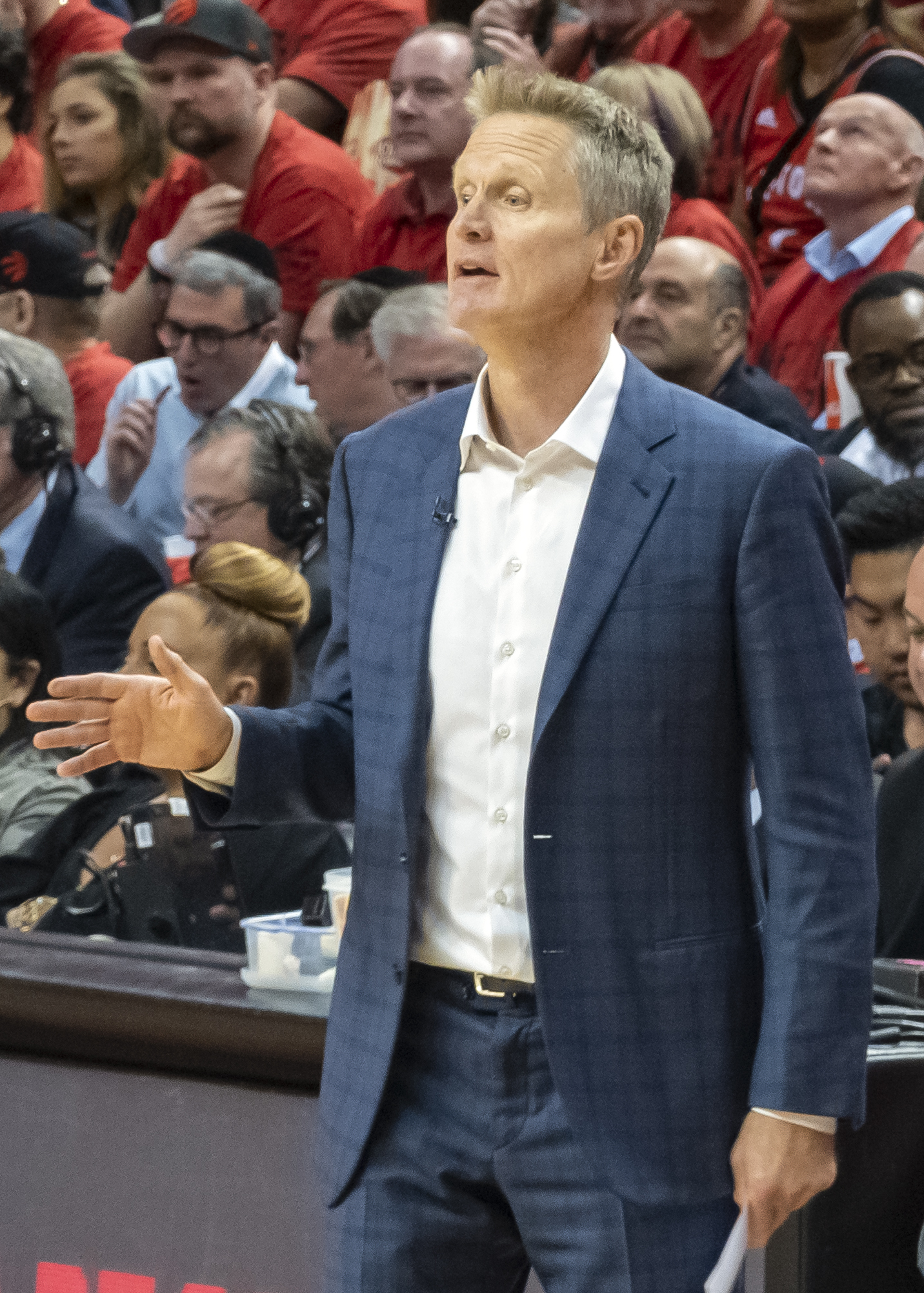
Golden State went on a 11–3 run in the fourth quarter after head coach Steve Kerr (pictured) decided to bench Warriors' staple Draymond Green in favor of Kevon Looney.

Curry scored 43 points and had 10 rebounds in a 107–97 win to even the series 2–2. He made two baskets during a 10–0 run for the Warriors in the fourth quarter, turning a four-point Boston advantage into a 100–94 lead for Golden State. He played 41 minutes and made 14 of 26 shots in the game, including 7 of 14 on 3-pointers. Andrew Wiggins added 17 points and a career-high 16 rebounds for the Warriors, who outrebounded Boston in the game, 47–31, including 15–6 on the offensive end.

Golden State changed its starting lineup, replacing Kevon Looney with Otto Porter Jr. Curry and the Tatum each scored 12 points in the first quarter, which ended with a 28–27 lead for Boston. Brown scored 10 points in the second quarter, giving the Celtics a 54–49 lead at halftime. There had been six lead changes in the game at that point, along with five ties. Curry scored 14 in the third for 33 going into the fourth. The teams were tied at 86 with eight minutes remaining. Boston led 94–90 with about five minutes left, but scored just once more, with 1:18 left. Golden State outscored them 17–3 to end the game, with Curry alone outscoring them 10–3.

Curry became the third Warriors player with at least 40 points and 10 rebounds in a Finals game, joining Rick Barry (1967) and Kevin Durant (2018). He also joined Jordan and LeBron James as the only players age 34 or older to score 40 or more points in an NBA Finals contest. Green scored two points on 1-of-7 shooting, but added nine rebounds, eight assists and four steals. Golden State head coach Steve Kerr benched him for parts of the fourth quarter, while Looney remained on the floor for his rebounding—11 in 28 minutes, along with a plus–minus of +21. The Warriors were down four points with around seven minutes remaining when Green was pulled, and went on an 11–3 run over the next four minutes before he returned. With his offensive struggles, he alternated offensive and defensive possessions with Poole. Tatum finished with 23 points and 11 rebounds, but made only one basket while playing the entire fourth quarter. Brown scored 21 points, and Williams had 12 rebounds.

=== Game 5 ===
ABC

June 13
9:00 pm (6:00 pm PDT)

Recap

Boston Celtics 94, Golden State Warriors 104
Scoring by quarter: 16–27, 23–24, 35–24, 20–29
Pts: Jayson Tatum 27; Rebs: Jayson Tatum 10; Asts: Brown, Tatum 4 each	Pts: Andrew Wiggins 26; Rebs: Andrew Wiggins 13; Asts: Stephen Curry 8
Golden State leads series, 3–2

Chase Center, San Francisco, California
Attendance: 18,064
Referees:
- No. 8 Marc Davis
- No. 25 Tony Brothers
- No. 58 Josh Tiven

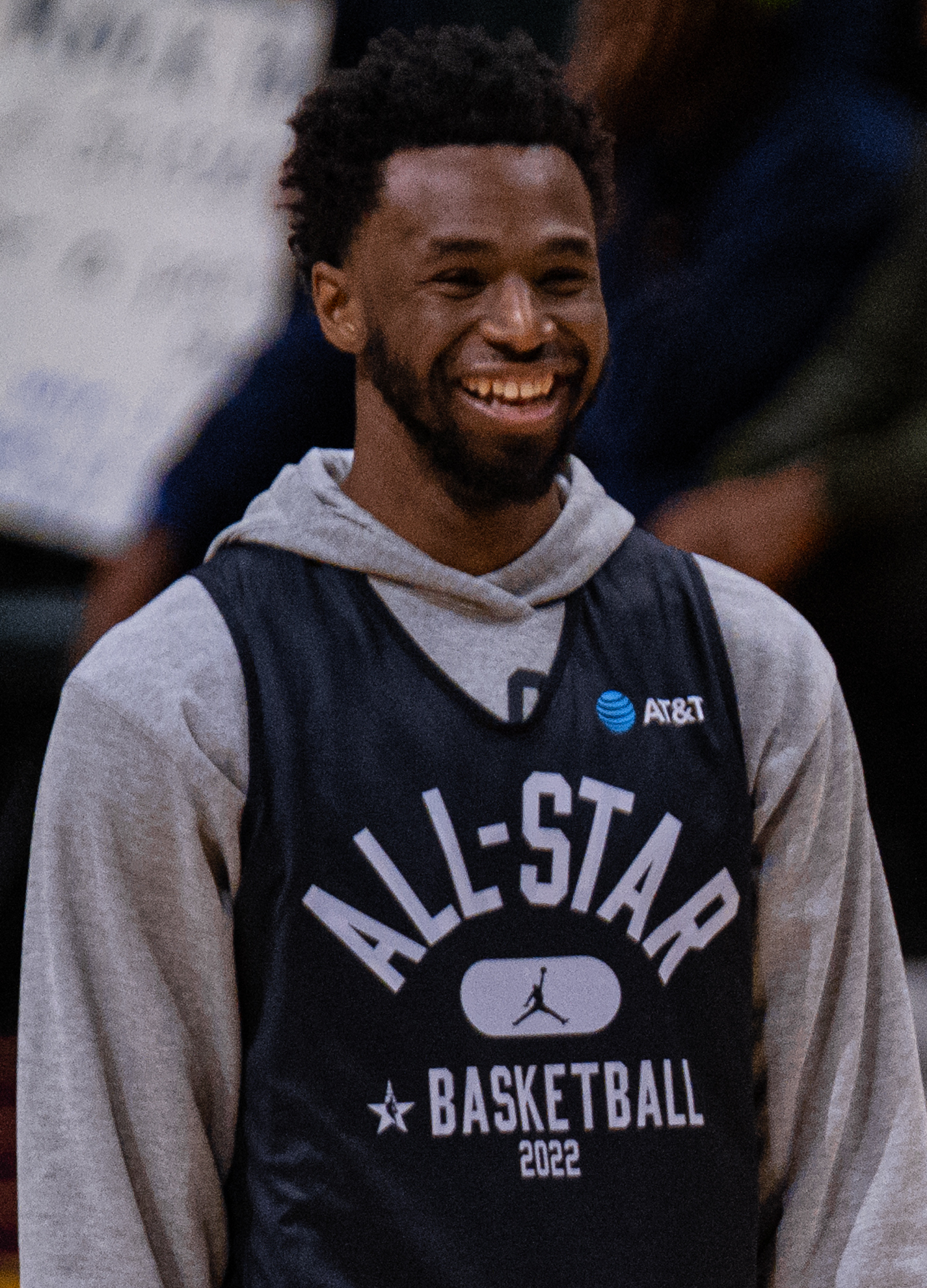
The Warriors' Andrew Wiggins had team highs of 26 points and 13 rebounds.

Wiggins had 26 points and 13 rebounds to lead Golden State to a 104–94 victory, placing them within a game of a championship. Thompson added 21 points to help the Warriors overcome an off night for Curry, who had 16 points and eight assists but went 0 for 9 from 3-point range. Boston was more aggressive in double-teaming Curry beyond the 3-point line. Before Game 5, he had NBA-record streaks of 38 consecutive games with multiple 3-pointers, 132 straight playoff games with a least one 3-point basket, and 233 consecutive games with a 3-pointer in the regular season and postseason combined. Tatum had a game-high 27 points and 10 rebounds. Boston lost consecutive games for the first time in these playoffs.

The Warriors led by as many as 16 points in the first quarter. Boston whittled away at the lead with Curry on the bench, but he made a layup to give Golden State a 51–39 advantage at halftime. Wiggins had 16 points and seven rebounds at the break, and Green was forceful with 8 points after totaling just 17 in the first four games. The Warriors were moving the ball well but shot just 3 for 17 on 3-pointers in the first half. Tatum had 13 points and eight rebounds to keep Boston in the game. After the break, the Celtics scored the first 10 points of the second half and took the lead after a 19–4 run. They made eight consecutive 3s after missing their first 12 of the game, while Golden State missed their first eight in the second half. Poole banked in a 33-foot (10 m) three-pointer to beat the third-quarter buzzer, giving the Warriors a 75–74 lead to enter the fourth.

Thompson shot 7 for 14 and made five 3-pointers. The Warriors were 9 of 40 on their 3s, including 0 of 6 from Wiggins. Green, who fouled out with 3:01 left, exited with eight points, eight rebounds, and seven assists. Golden State got 15 points off the bench from Payton and 14 from Poole. Boston shot 11 of 32 from behind the arc, with Brown going 0 for 5 and shooting 5 of 18 overall; he finished with 18 points. Williams had 10 points and eight rebounds.

=== Game 6 ===
ABC

June 16
9:00 pm

Recap

Golden State Warriors 103, Boston Celtics 90
Scoring by quarter: 27–22, 27–17, 22–27, 27–24
Pts: Stephen Curry 34; Rebs: Draymond Green 12; Asts: Draymond Green 8	Pts: Jaylen Brown 34; Rebs: Al Horford 14; Asts: Marcus Smart 9
Golden State wins NBA Finals, 4–2

TD Garden, Boston, Massachusetts
Attendance: 19,156
Referees:
- No. 15 Zach Zarba
- No. 16 David Guthrie
- No. 10 John Goble

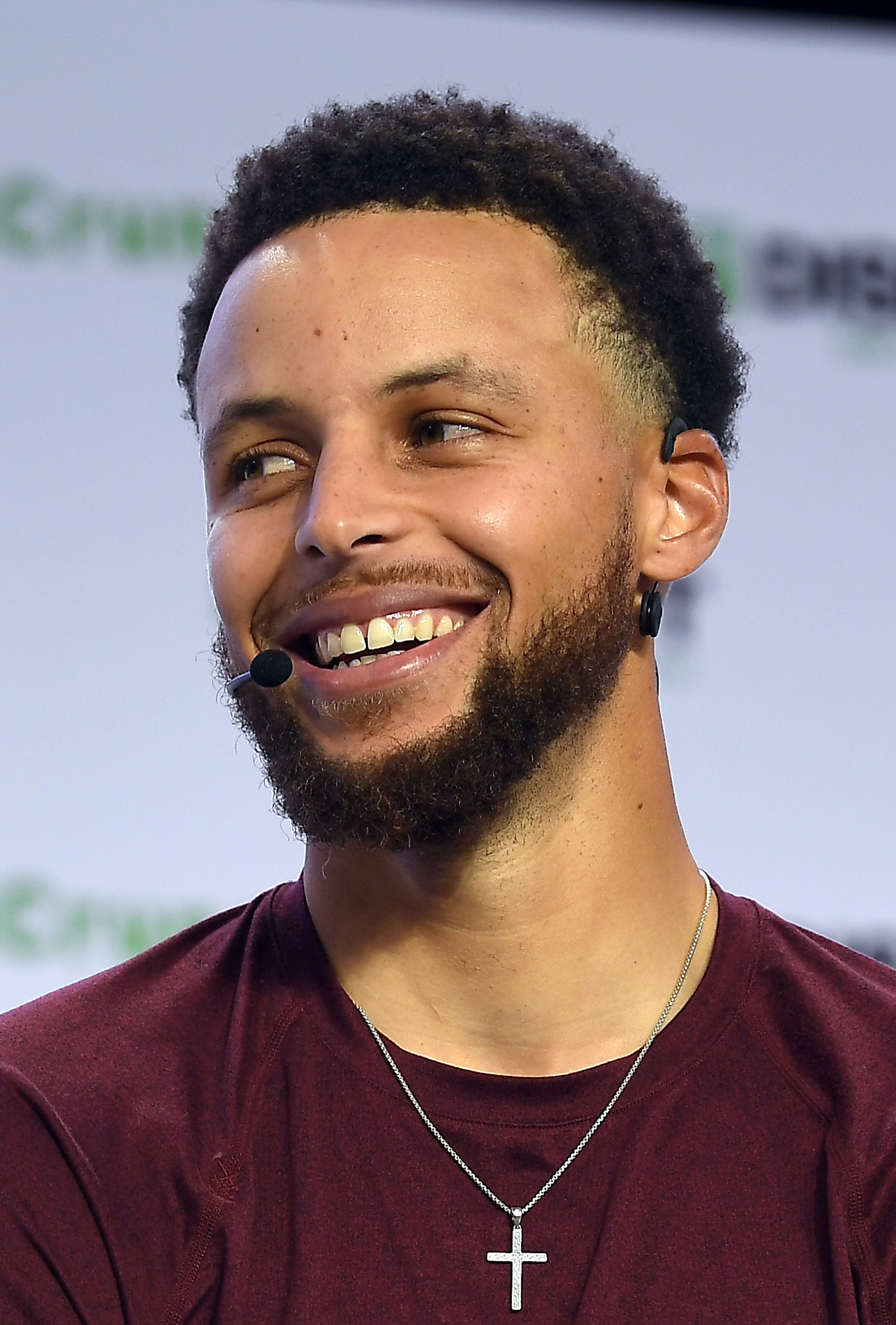
Stephen Curry was awarded his first Finals MVP, averaging 31.2 points per game in the series.

Coming into the game, Golden State was 0–3 in closeout games on the road, and the Celtics were 3–0 when facing elimination. Boston took a 14–2 lead to start the game, but made just one basket in the final 3:30 of the first quarter, and Golden State led 27–22 at the end of the period. The Warriors forced 12 turnovers in the first half and used a 21–0 run to take a 54–39 halftime lead. The 21–0 run was the longest such run in modern Finals history. They expanded their lead to 22 before the Celtics rallied to trail 76–66 after three quarters. Golden State maintained its lead through the fourth quarter to win the game 103–90 for its fourth NBA title in eight seasons. This was the second time that a road team won an NBA championship in Boston, the other being the Los Angeles Lakers in 1985.

Curry scored 34 points in the game, shooting 12-of-21 overall and 6-of-11 on 3-pointers, and added seven rebounds, seven assists, and two steals. He was voted the Finals MVP for the first time in his career, unanimously selected after averaging 31.2 points, 6.0 rebounds, and 5.0 assists in the series. He scored 30 or more points in three consecutive games in Boston, the first player to do so in the playoffs since LeBron James in 2017. Green scored 12 points on 5-of-10 shooting, grabbing 12 rebounds, recording eight assists with two steals and two blocks. He also hit two 3-pointers after missing his first 12 attempts of the series. Head coach Steve Kerr won his ninth championship overall, after winning five as a player. He became the sixth coach to capture four titles, joining Phil Jackson, Red Auerbach, John Kundla, Gregg Popovich, and Pat Riley. The Warriors also became the first team to go from the NBA's worst record (2019–20) to a championship within three seasons. With the win, the Warriors earned their seventh double-digit comeback win this postseason, tying the 2011 and 2012 Miami Heat for the most double-digit comeback wins by any team in the past 25 postseasons.

Brown led the Celtics with 34 points but Tatum finished with 13, shooting just 6-of-18 from the field. The Celtics' bench also performed poorly, getting just five points on 2-for-10 shooting from the field from their primary reserves—White, Grant Williams, and Payton Pritchard. Boston also committed 22 turnovers, dropping to 1–8 this postseason when committing 16 or more. Tatum set the NBA record for most turnovers in a single postseason with 100. The Celtics' Finals series record dropped to 17–5, remaining tied with the Lakers for the most championships in league history until 2024, where they won their 18th title.

== Rosters ==
=== Golden State Warriors ===
2021–22 Golden State Warriors roster
Players

Pos.	No.	Player	Height	Weight	DOB	From
F	8	Nemanja Bjelica	6 ft 9 in (2.06 m)	234 lb (106 kg)	1988-05-09	Serbia
G	2	Chris Chiozza (TW)	5 ft 11 in (1.80 m)	175 lb (79 kg)	1995-11-21	Florida
G	30	Stephen Curry	6 ft 2 in (1.88 m)	185 lb (84 kg)	1988-03-14	Davidson
F	23	Draymond Green	6 ft 6 in (1.98 m)	230 lb (104 kg)	1990-03-04	Michigan State
G/F	9	Andre Iguodala	6 ft 6 in (1.98 m)	215 lb (98 kg)	1984-01-28	Arizona
F	00	Jonathan Kuminga	6 ft 7 in (2.01 m)	225 lb (102 kg)	2002-10-06	The Patrick School (NJ)
G/F	1	Damion Lee	6 ft 5 in (1.96 m)	210 lb (95 kg)	1992-10-21	Louisville
F	5	Kevon Looney	6 ft 9 in (2.06 m)	222 lb (101 kg)	1996-02-06	UCLA
G	4	Moses Moody	6 ft 5 in (1.96 m)	211 lb (96 kg)	2002-05-31	Arkansas
G	0	Gary, II Payton	6 ft 3 in (1.91 m)	195 lb (88 kg)	1992-12-01	Oregon State
G	3	Jordan Poole	6 ft 4 in (1.93 m)	194 lb (88 kg)	1999-06-19	Michigan
F	32	Otto Jr. Porter	6 ft 8 in (2.03 m)	198 lb (90 kg)	1993-06-03	Georgetown
G	11	Klay Thompson	6 ft 6 in (1.98 m)	220 lb (100 kg)	1990-02-08	Washington State
F	95	Juan Toscano-Anderson	6 ft 6 in (1.98 m)	209 lb (95 kg)	1993-04-10	Marquette
G	12	Quinndary Weatherspoon (TW)	6 ft 3 in (1.91 m)	205 lb (93 kg)	1996-09-10	Mississippi State
F	22	Andrew Wiggins	6 ft 7 in (2.01 m)	197 lb (89 kg)	1995-02-23	Kansas
C	33	James Wiseman	7 ft 0 in (2.13 m)	240 lb (109 kg)	2001-03-31	Memphis

Coaches
Head coach
- Steve Kerr
Assistant(s)
- Ron Adams
- Kenny Atkinson
- Mike Brown
- Bruce Fraser
- Jama Mahlalela
- Dejan Milojević

Legend
- (DP) Unsigned draft pick
- (FA) Free agent
- (S) Suspended
- (GL) On assignment to G League affiliate
- (TW) Two-way affiliate player
- Injured

Roster
Updated: April 25, 2022

=== Boston Celtics ===
2021–22 Boston Celtics roster
Players

Pos.	No.	Player	Height	Weight	DOB	From
G/F	7	Jaylen Brown	6 ft 6 in (1.98 m)	223 lb (101 kg)	1996-10-24	California
F	8	Malik Fitts	6 ft 5 in (1.96 m)	230 lb (104 kg)	1997-07-04	Saint Mary's
F	30	Sam Hauser	6 ft 7 in (2.01 m)	217 lb (98 kg)	1997-12-08	Virginia
F/C	42	Al Horford	6 ft 9 in (2.06 m)	240 lb (109 kg)	1986-06-03	Florida
F/C	40	Luke Kornet	7 ft 2 in (2.18 m)	250 lb (113 kg)	1995-07-15	Vanderbilt
F	4	Juwan Morgan	6 ft 7 in (2.01 m)	232 lb (105 kg)	1997-04-17	Indiana
G/F	26	Aaron Nesmith	6 ft 5 in (1.96 m)	215 lb (98 kg)	1999-10-16	Vanderbilt
G	11	Payton Pritchard	6 ft 1 in (1.85 m)	195 lb (88 kg)	1998-01-28	Oregon
F	37	Matt Ryan (TW)	6 ft 7 in (2.01 m)	215 lb (98 kg)	1997-04-17	Chattanooga
G	36	Marcus Smart	6 ft 4 in (1.93 m)	220 lb (100 kg)	1994-03-06	Oklahoma State
G	13	Nik Stauskas	6 ft 6 in (1.98 m)	207 lb (94 kg)	1993-10-07	Michigan
G/F	0	Jayson Tatum	6 ft 8 in (2.03 m)	210 lb (95 kg)	1998-03-03	Duke
F/C	27	Daniel Theis	6 ft 9 in (2.06 m)	245 lb (111 kg)	1992-04-04	Germany
G	97	Brodric Thomas (TW)	6 ft 5 in (1.96 m)	185 lb (84 kg)	1997-01-28	Truman State
G	9	Derrick White	6 ft 4 in (1.93 m)	190 lb (86 kg)	1994-07-02	Colorado
F	12	Grant Williams	6 ft 6 in (1.98 m)	236 lb (107 kg)	1998-11-30	Tennessee
F/C	44	Robert III Williams	6 ft 9 in (2.06 m)	237 lb (108 kg)	1997-10-17	Texas A&M

Coaches
Head coach
- Ime Udoka
Assistant(s)
- Will Hardy
- Tony Dobbins
- Joe Mazzulla
- Aaron Miles
- Damon Stoudamire
- Ben Sullivan

Legend
- (DP) Unsigned draft pick
- (FA) Free agent
- (S) Suspended
- (GL) On assignment to G League affiliate
- (TW) Two-way affiliate player
- Injured

Roster
Updated: April 9, 2022

== Player statistics ==
Legend
GP	Games played	GS	Games started	MPG	Minutes per game
FG%	Field-goal percentage	3P%	3-point field-goal percentage	FT%	Free-throw percentage
RPG	Rebounds per game	APG	Assists per game	SPG	Steals per game
BPG	Blocks per game	PPG	Points per game

Boston Celtics statistics
Player	GP	GS	MPG	FG%	3P%	FT%	RPG	APG	SPG	BPG	PPG
Jaylen Brown	6	6	38.8	.431	.340	.806	7.3	3.7	0.8	0.3	**23.5**
Jayson Tatum	6	6	**40.7**	.367	.455	.656	6.8	**7.0**	1.2	0.7	21.5
Marcus Smart	6	6	35.5	.430	.412	.750	4.5	5.0	**1.5**	0.0	15.2
Al Horford	6	6	31.8	.605	.625	.667	**8.5**	2.8	0.7	0.7	12.5
Robert Williams III	6	6	26.3	.769	.000	.833	7.5	1.5	0.8	**2.8**	7.5
Derrick White	6	0	26.5	.327	.400	**.929**	1.5	2.2	0.7	0.5	9.8
Grant Williams	6	0	17.0	.529	.300	.667	2.3	1.0	0.2	0.7	4.2
Payton Pritchard	6	0	11.2	.300	.214	.500	2.2	1.0	0.2	0.0	2.7
Luke Kornet	3	0	2.0	**1.000**	**1.000**	.000	0.7	0.3	0.0	0.0	1.7
Daniel Theis	2	0	10.0	.500	.500	.000	2.5	0.5	0.0	1.0	1.5
Aaron Nesmith	5	0	3.2	.333	.000	.750	0.8	0.4	0.2	0.0	1.4
Malik Fitts	3	0	2.0	**1.000**	**1.000**	.000	0.0	0.0	0.0	0.0	1.0
Sam Hauser	5	0	2.2	.333	.500	.000	0.0	0.4	0.0	0.0	0.6
Nik Stauskas	5	0	1.8	.250	.250	.000	0.6	0.2	0.0	0.0	0.6
Juwan Morgan	4	0	1.3	.000	.000	.000	0.3	0.0	0.0	0.0	0.0

Golden State Warriors statistics
Player	GP	GS	MPG	FG%	3P%	FT%	RPG	APG	SPG	BPG	PPG
Stephen Curry	6	6	37.5	.482	.437	.857	6.0	5.0	**2.0**	0.2	**31.2**
Andrew Wiggins	6	6	**39.2**	.446	.297	.692	**8.8**	2.2	1.5	**1.5**	18.3
Klay Thompson	6	6	38.3	.356	.351	**1.000**	3.0	2.0	1.3	0.5	17.0
Draymond Green	6	6	36.2	.333	.125	.583	8.0	**6.2**	1.7	0.7	6.2
Otto Porter Jr.	6	3	17.0	.588	.563	**1.000**	2.0	1.0	1.0	0.2	5.2
Kevon Looney	6	3	21.7	.636	.000	**1.000**	7.5	2.7	0.7	0.8	5.0
Jordan Poole	6	0	20.8	.435	.385	.909	1.8	1.8	0.5	0.2	13.2
Gary Payton II	5	0	18.6	.591	.286	.700	3.2	1.4	1.6	0.4	7.0
Andre Iguodala	4	0	4.8	.750	**1.000**	.000	0.0	1.3	0.0	0.0	1.8
Nemanja Bjelica	5	0	5.8	.500	.500	.000	1.6	0.2	0.4	0.0	1.8
Moses Moody	4	0	2.8	**1.000**	.000	.000	0.0	0.0	0.0	0.3	0.5
Jonathan Kuminga	4	0	2.0	.000	.000	.000	0.3	0.0	0.0	0.0	0.0
Damion Lee	4	0	2.0	.000	.000	.000	0.0	0.0	0.0	0.0	0.0
Juan Toscano-Anderson	4	0	2.0	.000	.000	.000	0.5	0.8	0.0	0.0	0.0

- Bold: team high

== Redesigned logo and trophy ==
On April 13, the NBA released a reimagined version of the classic NBA Finals wordmark that was used between 1986 and 1995 and from 2004 to 2017. The new logo also features a depiction of the Larry O'Brien Championship Trophy in the background.

The NBA then announced on May 12 that the Larry O'Brien Championship Trophy and the Bill Russell NBA Finals Most Valuable Player Trophy have also been redesigned. Among the new changes to the Larry O'Brien Trophy, its base now consists of two disks that list the names of all the previous winning teams. The Bill Russell Trophy has been changed from a gold ball and silver net to primarily gold with silver accents.

Russell died at his Mercer Island, Washington, home on July 31, 2022, at the age of 88. The news was announced in a Twitter post by his family. In a statement, NBA Commissioner Adam Silver said that Russell was "the greatest champion in all of team sports".

With NBA commissioner Adam Silver missing games 5 and 6 due to the league's health and safety protocols, the Larry O'Brien Trophy was presented to the Warriors by deputy commissioner Mark Tatum instead.

== Media coverage ==
The Finals was televised in the United States by ABC (which included local affiliate WCVB-TV in Boston and O&O KGO-TV in San Francisco) for the 20th consecutive year.

Lead play-by-play announcer Mike Breen and lead analyst Jeff Van Gundy both missed Game 1 due to COVID-19 protocols. ESPN's No. 2 play-by-play announcer, Mark Jones, filled in for Breen during games 1 and 2. Jones, Mark Jackson and Lisa Salters made history in Game 1 as the first all-African American broadcast team to cover an NBA Finals game. Van Gundy returned to the broadcast booth for Game 2, followed by Breen in Game 3.

ESPN put together a Megacast option for Game 1 called NBA Finals: Celebrating 75, hosted by Michael Eaves alongside New Orleans Pelicans guard CJ McCollum and Tim Legler. It was broadcast on ESPN2 due to ESPN's commitments to have the Women's College World Series on the main network.

=== Viewership ===
Game	Ratings (American households)	American audience (in millions)	Ref
1	6.4	11.90	
2	6.2	11.91	
3	6.2	11.52	
4	6.2	12.06	
5	7.0	13.03	
6	7.5	13.99	
Avg	6.6	12.40	

== Aftermath ==
=== Golden State ===
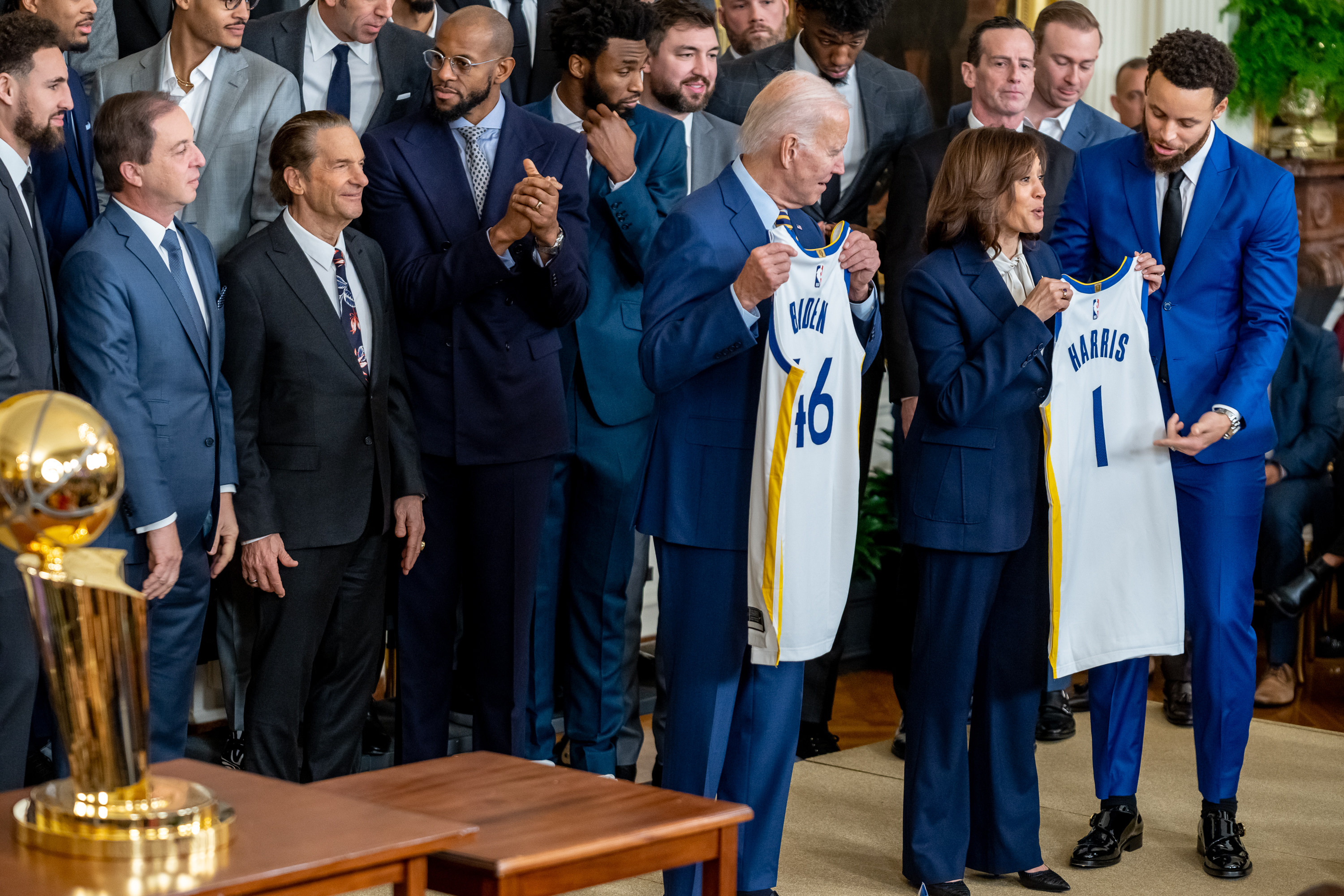
Stephen Curry presenting President Joe Biden and Vice President Kamala Harris with a jersey during the Warriors White House visit the following season.

In the following season, the Warriors struggled almost immediately. During a team practice on October 5, 2022, Jordan Poole and teammate Draymond Green got into an altercation, resulting in Green striking Poole with a sucker punch. TMZ published a leaked video on October 7, showing the punch but not what led to the incident. On October 9, Green publicly apologized for the incident and announced that he would spend a few days away from the team. On October 12, the team fined Green for the altercation as opposed to the suspected suspension.

This incident essentially loomed over the season. The Warriors had an uneven season, having the worst records on the road while also having one of the best at home. They finished with a winning record for the tenth time in the previous eleven seasons, and clinched the sixth seed in the playoffs. In the first round of the playoffs, they eliminated the third-seeded Sacramento Kings in seven games, with Stephen Curry scoring a then-record 50 points in a Game 7. However, the Warriors 18–0 record under Steve Kerr in Western Conference playoff series ended after their defeat to the Los Angeles Lakers in the Western Conference Semifinals in six games. The series pitted old foes LeBron James and Stephen Curry; with this backdrop and considering the potential to be their last meeting in the playoffs, the series averaged 7.8 million viewers across ESPN, TNT, and ABC, making it the most-watched Conference Semifinals in 27 years. General manager Bob Myers would step down after the season.

Poole, who starred during their NBA Finals run in 2022, struggled throughout the season. After the season, Kerr said the Warriors were not a championship team due to a lack of trust on the team, in part due to Green's punching Poole, and Green blamed their early playoff exit on his punch. Poole was later traded in the off-season to the Wizards and continued to bounce around the league, never regaining his form from the 2022 NBA Finals run.

=== Boston ===
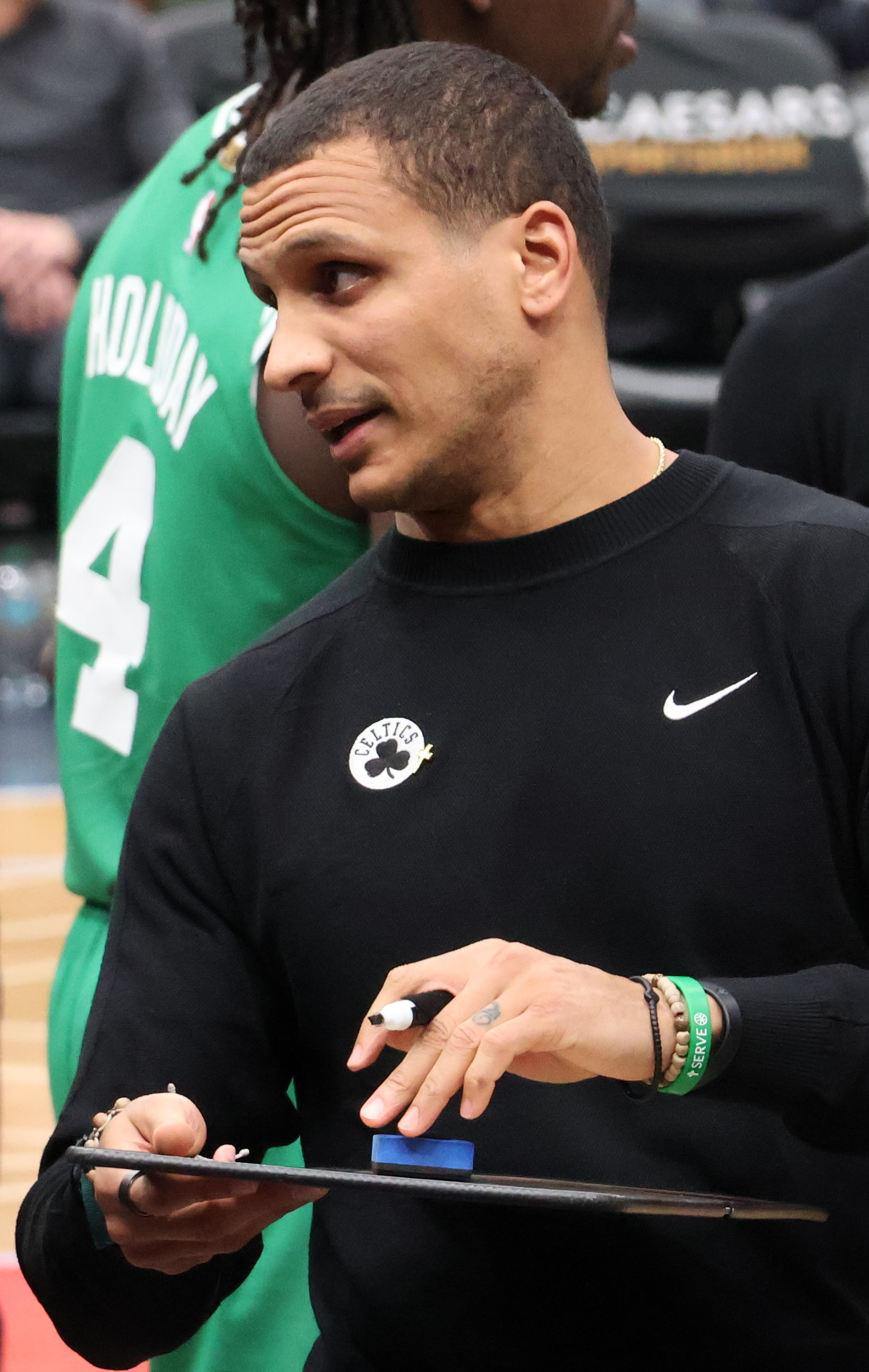
Just before the start of the 2022-23 season, Joe Mazzulla took over for Ime Udoka after Udoka broke team rules that led to his season-long suspension.

The Celtics would have their own controversy surrounding head coach Ime Udoka. On September 22, 2022, head coach Udoka was suspended until June 30, 2023, for a violation of the team's code of conduct, following a team investigation into an inappropriate relationship between himself and a female Celtics staff member. The relationship was consensual, but nevertheless broke team rules. As a result, assistant coach Joe Mazzulla was named interim head coach and later given the position full time in February.

Under Mazzulla, the Celtics managed to improve on their previous season's record by six games, finishing with a 57–25 record and achieving their most regular season wins since 2009. The team, however, struggled all postseason long, taking six games to defeat an inferior Atlanta Hawks team in the first round, and needing a 3–2 series comeback to defeat their rivals Philadelphia 76ers in the next round (coincidentally, Jayson Tatum surpassed Curry's Game 7 record from earlier in the playoffs with 51 points). In the Eastern Conference Finals, the Celtics fell down 0–3 in the series versus the eighth-seeded Miami Heat, only to mount a comeback to force a Game 7. In the Game 7, the Celtics were discombobulated from the start, as they missed their first 12 three-point attempts and finished the game shooting 21% from deep. Jayson Tatum also turned his ankle on the first play and wasn't the same after. They lost the game, 103–84, thus ending their once promising season.

The Celtics made two bold moves before following season. On June 22, 2023, the team traded longtime Celtic and reigning Defensive Player of the Year, Marcus Smart, in a package that acquired stretch big man Kristaps Porziņģis. Their second re-imagining of the team occurred just before training camp, when the Celtics acquired Jrue Holiday in a three-team deal that also sent star guard Damian Lillard to Milwaukee and Robert Williams III, reigning Sixth Man of the Year Malcolm Brogdon, and draft compensation to Portland. Porziņģis gave the Celtics a three-point threat and insurance for the aging Al Horford, while Holiday gave the team championship experience to a team that lacked it, as Holiday had won a ring with the 2021 Milwaukee Bucks. These moves, along with the continued evolution of the Brown and Tatum duo, put the Celtics over the top in 2023-2024. They won 64 games in the regular season and lost just three games in the playoffs. In the Finals, they defeated the Dallas Mavericks in five games to win their 18th championship in franchise history and break a tie with the Los Angeles Lakers for most NBA championships.
