= Marcus Timmons =

American basketball player (born 1971)

Personal information
- Born: October 18, 1971 (age 55) Missouri, U.S.
- Listed height: 202 cm (6 ft 8 in)
- Listed weight: 100 kg (220 lb)

Career information
- High school: Scott County Central (Sikeston, Missouri)
- College: Southern Illinois (1991–1995)
- NBA draft: 1995: undrafted
- Playing career: 1996–2007
- Position: Forward / center
- Number: 40

Career history
- 1996: Illawarra Hawks
- 1997–1999: Melbourne Tigers
- 2000–2001: Perth Wildcats
- 2002–2003: Melbourne Tigers
- 2004–2005: Cairns Taipans
- 2005: New Zealand Breakers
- 2007: Adelaide 36ers

Career highlights
- 2× NBL champion (1997, 2000); NBL Grand Final MVP (2000); All-NBL Second Team (1999); Mr. Show-Me Basketball (1991)

Marcus Davis Timmons (born October 18, 1971) is an American-Australian former professional basketball player. He played for the Wollongong Hawks, Melbourne Tigers, Perth Wildcats, Cairns Taipans, New Zealand Breakers and Adelaide 36ers. Timmons won NBL championships with the Tigers in 1997 and the Wildcats in 2000.

Timmons has also played pro basketball in the Philippines, Poland, and Latvia. He won a Latvian championship with ASK/Brocēni/LMT. He is the uncle of NBA player Otto Porter Jr.

Timmons was named Mr. Show-Me Basketball in 1991 while he played at Scott County Central High School in Sikeston, Missouri. He played college basketball for Southern Illinois University. He was part of three Saluki NCAA Tournament appearances and an NIT appearance. He was Missouri Valley Conference Defensive Player of the year in 1995. He was named to the SIU All-Century team in 2013 and is a member of the SIU Saluki Hall of Fame.
