= Jimmy Whitt =

American basketball player

No. 33 – Perth Wildcats
- Position: Point guard
- League: NBL

Personal information
- Born: January 9, 1997 (age 29) Columbia, Missouri, U.S.
- Listed height: 6 ft 3 in (1.91 m)
- Listed weight: 175 lb (79 kg)

Career information
- High school: Hickman (Columbia, Missouri)
- College: Arkansas (2015–2016); SMU (2017–2019); Arkansas (2019–2020)
- NBA draft: 2020: undrafted
- Playing career: 2021–present

Career history
- 2021–2022: Cleveland Charge
- 2023: Halcones de Ciudad Obregón
- 2023–2024: Santa Cruz Warriors
- 2026: Gold Coast Rollers
- 2026–present: Perth Wildcats

Career highlights
- NBL1 North champion (2026); NBL1 North All-Star Five First Team (2026); NBL1 North Defensive Player of the Year (2026); Mr. Show-Me Basketball (2015)

James Arthur Whitt Jr. (born January 9, 1997) is an American professional basketball player for the Perth Wildcats of the Australian National Basketball League (NBL). He played college basketball for the Arkansas Razorbacks and SMU Mustangs.

== Early life ==
Whitt was born on January 9, 1997, in Columbia, Missouri, to James and Annelle Whitt. His father played basketball at the Indiana Institute of Technology, and was a prominent community leader in Columbia before his death in 2021. Whitt was inspired to play basketball because of his older brother, Marcus. He received coaching from his father who emphasised the development of his midrange game.

Whitt attended Hickman High School in Columbia where he first started to take basketball seriously during his freshman year. He was a three-time All-State selection. Whitt averaged 30.6 points per game during his senior season. He was chosen as Mr. Show-Me Basketball in 2015. Whitt finished his career with 2,411 points and 399 steals.

Whitt was rated as a four-star point guard and ranked by ESPN as the top prospect of his class in Missouri. On August 19, 2014, Whitt verbally committed to play college basketball for the Arkansas Razorbacks. He had received more than 25 offers from college programs.

== College career ==
Whitt appeared in all 32 games during his freshman season with the Arkansas Razorbacks and averaged 6.1 points in 17.2 minutes per game. Head coach Mike Anderson played him as a wing instead of his natural point guard position. On March 30, 2016, Whitt announced that he would transfer from the program. On May 2, he announced that he would transfer to the SMU Mustangs who had recruited him during high school. He had to sit out the 2016–17 season due to NCAA transfer rules.

Whitt was a starter for SMU during the two seasons he played there. He averaged 10.5 points and 5.2 rebounds per game during the 2017–18 season. Whitt averaged 12.3 points and a team-high 6.4 rebounds per game during the 2018–19 season. He declared for the 2019 NBA draft in March but withdrew on May 26.

On May 27, 2019, Whitt announced that he would transfer back to Arkansas. His decision was due to new head coach Eric Musselman who had been recommended by Whitt's brother Marcus. Whitt's move was compared to Sunday Adebayo who had also returned to Arkansas after transferring to another program in the 1990s. He averaged 14.0 points per game during the 2019–20 season.

== Professional career ==
Whitt joined the Cleveland Charge of the NBA G League in 2021 after he attended a local tryout.

Whitt played for the Halcones de Ciudad Obregón of the Liga Mexicana de Básquetbol CIBACOPA in 2023.

Whitt joined the Santa Cruz Warriors of the NBA G League in 2023 after he attended a local tryout. He attended training camp with the Warriors in 2025, but ruptured his Achilles and was unable to rejoin the team.

On April 12, 2026, Whitt signed with the Gold Coast Rollers of the NBL1 North. He averaged 22.79 points, 6.32 rebounds and 6.05 assists per game. Whitt was selected to the NBL1 North All-Star Five First Team and chosen as the NBL1 North Defensive Player of the Year. The Rollers won the 2026 NBL1 North championship.

On August 12, 2026, Whitt signed with the Perth Wildcats of the Australian National Basketball League (NBL) as a nominated replacement player for the 2026–27 season. On October 17, he scored 15 points off the bench, including 11 in the fourth quarter, in a 102–81 loss to the Sydney Kings. On October 21, it was announced that Whitt had returned home to the United States for personal reasons.

== Personal life ==
Whitt's older brother, Marcus, played college basketball at Columbia College.

Whitt is the treasurer of The James & Annelle Whitt Entrepreneurial Development Foundation which was founded in dedication to his father.
