= Morley, Missouri =

- City
- Location of Morley, Missouri
- Coordinates: 37°02′36″N 89°36′44″W
- Country: United States
- State: Missouri
- County: Scott
- Incorporation: 1872

Area
  - Total: 0.80 sq mi (2.08 km^{2})
  - Land: 0.80 sq mi (2.08 km^{2})
  - Water: 0 sq mi (0.00 km^{2})
- Elevation: 341 ft (104 m)

Population (2020)
  - Total: 630
  - Density: 786.0/sq mi (303.49/km^{2})
- Time zone: UTC-6 (Central (CST))
  - Summer (DST): UTC-5 (CDT)
- ZIP code: 63767
- Area code: 573
- FIPS code: 29-49988
- GNIS feature ID: 2395404

Morley is a city in Scott County, Missouri, United States. The population was 630 at the 2020 census.

== History ==
Morley was platted in 1868. The community has the name of J. H. Morley, a railroad official. A post office called Morley has been in operation since 1869.

== Geography ==
According to the United States Census Bureau, the city has a total area of 0.80 square miles (2.07 km^{2}), all land.

== Demographics ==
Historical population
Census	Pop.	Note	%±
1880	232		—
1890	395		70.3%
1900	437		10.6%
1910	494		13.0%
1920	599		21.3%
1930	478		−20.2%
1940	522		9.2%
1950	494		−5.4%
1960	472		−4.5%
1970	528		11.9%
1980	745		41.1%
1990	683		−8.3%
2000	792		16.0%
2010	697		−12.0%
2020	630		−9.6%
U.S. Decennial Census

=== 2010 census ===
As of the census of 2010, there were 697 people, 284 households, and 195 families living in the city. The population density was 871.3 inhabitants per square mile (336.4/km^{2}). There were 323 housing units at an average density of 403.8 per square mile (155.9/km^{2}). The racial makeup of the city was 94.98% White, 1.15% Black or African American, 0.43% Native American, and 3.44% from two or more races. Hispanic or Latino of any race were 1.72% of the population.

There were 284 households, of which 32.4% had children under the age of 18 living with them, 48.2% were married couples living together, 15.1% had a female householder with no husband present, 5.3% had a male householder with no wife present, and 31.3% were non-families. 26.8% of all households were made up of individuals, and 12.4% had someone living alone who was 65 years of age or older. The average household size was 2.43 and the average family size was 2.92.

The median age in the city was 40.9 years. 24.1% of residents were under the age of 18; 8.1% were between the ages of 18 and 24; 23.6% were from 25 to 44; 27% were from 45 to 64; and 17.1% were 65 years of age or older. The gender makeup of the city was 47.1% male and 52.9% female.

=== 2000 census ===
As of the census of 2000, there were 792 people, 315 households, and 219 families living in the city. The population density was 1,070.9 inhabitants per square mile (413.5/km^{2}). There were 340 housing units at an average density of 459.7 per square mile (177.5/km^{2}). The racial makeup of the city was 98.23% White, 0.76% African American, 0.25% Native American, and 0.76% from two or more races. Hispanic or Latino of any race were 0.76% of the population.

There were 315 households, out of which 34.3% had children under the age of 18 living with them, 54.9% were married couples living together, 10.8% had a female householder with no husband present, and 30.2% were non-families. 26.0% of all households were made up of individuals, and 12.1% had someone living alone who was 65 years of age or older. The average household size was 2.50 and the average family size was 2.98.

In the city the population was spread out, with 26.8% under the age of 18, 5.8% from 18 to 24, 28.4% from 25 to 44, 24.1% from 45 to 64, and 14.9% who were 65 years of age or older. The median age was 36 years. For every 100 females there were 91.3 males. For every 100 females age 18 and over, there were 92.7 males.

The median income for a household in the city was $26,696, and the median income for a family was $35,000. Males had a median income of $25,625 versus $17,917 for females. The per capita income for the city was $12,679. About 10.9% of families and 15.4% of the population were below the poverty line, including 15.5% of those under age 18 and 20.2% of those age 65 or over.

== Education ==
It is in the Scott County Central Schools school district. The district's comprehensive high school is Scott County Central High School.

The Morley School District existed by 1872 and had a school building, with a replacement in 1882, and another one built around 1885, replacing the former one. In 1940, a new high school was built in which students attended, through 1959 when the consolidation with the Vanduser schools occurred, and Scott County Central High opened. The new high school became Scott County Central High School, and was built on Highway 61 south of the village near Kluges Hill.
