= Scott County Central High School =

High school in Missouri, United States

Coordinates: 36.981078°N 89.6208°W

Location
- 20794 U.S. Highway 61; Sikeston, (Scott County), Missouri 63801; United States

Information
- Type: Public middle and high school
- Principal: Gary Mize
- Staff: 12.25 (FTE)
- Enrollment: 108 (2024-2025)
- Student to teacher ratio: 8.82
- Colors: Orange, black, and white
- Nickname: Braves

Scott County Central High School is a middle school and high school at 20794 US Highway 61 in Scott County, Missouri (Sikeston postal address). It is a part of Scott County Central Schools school district, which includes Haywood City, Morley, and Vanduser.

It is in proximity to Kluge's Hill. The school is 8 miles (13 km) north of the center of Sikeston. The school colors are orange, black, and white, and the mascot is the Braves.

The high school has an enrollment of 151.

The school was created in 1959, by the merger of the Morley and Vanduser high schools. The school colors were retained from the original Vanduser High School (black and orange) and Morley High School (black and white). It competes in the Scott-Mississippi Conference.

Scott County competes in Class 2 and is a member of the Missouri State High School Activities Association.

== Athletics ==
It has won 18 state championships in boys basketball—the most of any high school in the state.

== Notable alumni ==
- Marcus Timmons, 1991, basketball player
- Otto Porter Jr., 2011, basketball player
