= Haywood City, Missouri =

- Village
- Location of Haywood City, Missouri
- Coordinates: 37°00′42″N 89°36′01″W
- Country: United States
- State: Missouri
- County: Scott
- Incorporated: 1822

Area
  - Total: 0.43 sq mi (1.11 km^{2})
  - Land: 0.43 sq mi (1.11 km^{2})
  - Water: 0 sq mi (0.00 km^{2})
- Elevation: 341 ft (104 m)

Population (2020)
  - Total: 133
  - Density: 311/sq mi (120.1/km^{2})
- Time zone: UTC-6 (Central (CST))
  - Summer (DST): UTC-5 (CDT)
- ZIP codes: 63736, 63771
- Area code: 573
- FIPS code: 29-31204
- GNIS feature ID: 2398271

Haywood City is a village in Scott County, Missouri, United States. As of the 2020 census, Haywood City had a population of 133.

== Geography ==
According to the United States Census Bureau, the village has a total area of 0.43 square miles (1.11 km^{2}), all land.

== Demographics ==
Historical population
Census	Pop.	Note	%±
1970	420		—
1980	425		1.2%
1990	263		−38.1%
2000	239		−9.1%
2010	206		−13.8%
2020	133		−35.4%
U.S. Decennial Census

=== 2020 census ===
Haywood City village, Missouri – Racial and ethnic composition Note: the US Census treats Hispanic/Latino as an ethnic category. This table excludes Latinos from the racial categories and assigns them to a separate category. Hispanics/Latinos may be of any race.
Race / Ethnicity (NH = Non-Hispanic)	Pop 2000	Pop 2010	Pop 2020	% 2000	% 2010	% 2020
White alone (NH)	10	11	11	4.18%	5.34%	8.27%
Black or African American alone (NH)	227	183	110	94.98%	88.83%	82.71%
Native American or Alaska Native alone (NH)	0	0	0	0.00%	0.00%	0.00%
Asian alone (NH)	0	0	0	0.00%	0.00%	0.00%
Native Hawaiian or Pacific Islander alone (NH)	0	0	0	0.00%	0.00%	0.00%
Other race alone (NH)	0	2	1	0.00%	0.97%	0.75%
Mixed race or Multiracial (NH)	2	7	7	0.84%	3.40%	5.26%
Hispanic or Latino (any race)	0	3	4	0.00%	1.46%	3.01%
Total	239	206	133	100.00%	100.00%	100.00%

=== 2010 census ===
As of the census of 2010, there were 206 people, 71 households, and 50 families living in the village. The population density was 479.1 inhabitants per square mile (185.0/km^{2}). There were 82 housing units at an average density of 190.7 per square mile (73.6/km^{2}). The racial makeup of the village was 5.34% White, 90.29% Black or African American, 0.97% from other races, and 3.40% from two or more races. Hispanic or Latino of any race were 1.46% of the population.

There were 71 households, of which 45.1% had children under the age of 18 living with them, 33.8% were married couples living together, 29.6% had a female householder with no husband present, 7.0% had a male householder with no wife present, and 29.6% were non-families. 21.1% of all households were made up of individuals, and 5.6% had someone living alone who was 65 years of age or older. The average household size was 2.90 and the average family size was 3.46.

The median age in the village was 34 years. 30.6% of residents were under the age of 18; 11.3% were between the ages of 18 and 24; 18.5% were from 25 to 44; 29.7% were from 45 to 64; and 10.2% were 65 years of age or older. The gender makeup of the village was 49.0% male and 51.0% female.

=== 2000 census ===
As of the census of 2000, there were 239 people, 81 households, and 57 families living in the village. The population density was 554.2 inhabitants per square mile (214.0/km^{2}). There were 92 housing units at an average density of 213.3 per square mile (82.4/km^{2}). The racial makeup of the village was 4.18% White, 94.98% African American, and 0.84% from two or more races.

There were 81 households, out of which 38.3% had children under the age of 18 living with them, 32.1% were married couples living together, 29.6% had a female householder with no husband present, and 29.6% were non-families. 23.5% of all households were made up of individuals, and 7.4% had someone living alone who was 65 years of age or older. The average household size was 2.95 and the average family size was 3.28.

In the village, the population was spread out, with 40.6% under the age of 18, 5.0% from 18 to 24, 25.9% from 25 to 44, 17.6% from 45 to 64, and 10.9% who were 65 years of age or older. The median age was 30 years. For every 100 females, there were 97.5 males. For every 100 females age 18 and over, there were 82.1 males.

The median income for a household in the village was $14,000, and the median income for a family was $20,833. Males had a median income of $22,000 versus $17,083 for females. The per capita income for the village was $7,553. About 34.4% of families and 36.5% of the population were below the poverty line, including 34.5% of those under the age of eighteen and 72.0% of those 65 or over.

== Education ==
It is in the Scott County Central Schools school district. The district's comprehensive high school is Scott County Central High School.

Three Rivers College's service area includes Scott County.
