= Vanduser, Missouri =

- Village
- Location of Vanduser, Missouri
- Coordinates: 36°59′28″N 89°41′12″W
- Country: United States
- State: Missouri
- County: Scott

Area
  - Total: 0.13 sq mi (0.33 km^{2})
  - Land: 0.13 sq mi (0.33 km^{2})
  - Water: 0 sq mi (0.00 km^{2})
- Elevation: 312 ft (95 m)

Population (2020)
  - Total: 183
  - Density: 1,424/sq mi (549.9/km^{2})
- Time zone: UTC-6 (Central (CST))
  - Summer (DST): UTC-5 (CDT)
- ZIP code: 63784
- Area code: 573
- FIPS code: 29-75724
- GNIS feature ID: 2400047
- Website: www.vandusermo.org

Vanduser is a village in Scott County, Missouri, United States. As of the 2020 census, Vanduser had a population of 183. The zip code is 63784.

== History ==
Vanduser was laid out in 1895 when the railroad was extended to that point. A post office called Vanduser has been in operation since 1898. The community has the name of John Vanduser, the original owner of the town site.

== Geography ==
According to the United States Census Bureau, the village has a total area of 0.13 square miles (0.34 km^{2}), all land.

== Demographics ==
Historical population
Census	Pop.	Note	%±
1910	388		—
1920	326		−16.0%
1930	236		−27.6%
1940	291		23.3%
1950	281		−3.4%
1960	272		−3.2%
1970	306		12.5%
1980	320		4.6%
1990	187		−41.6%
2000	217		16.0%
2010	267		23.0%
2020	183		−31.5%
U.S. Decennial Census

=== 2010 census ===
As of the census of 2010, there were 267 people, 94 households, and 59 families living in the village. The population density was 2,053.8 inhabitants per square mile (793.0/km^{2}). There were 102 housing units at an average density of 784.6 per square mile (302.9/km^{2}). The racial makeup of the village was 91.01% White, 3.00% Black or African American, 0.37% Native American, 2.25% from other races, and 3.37% from two or more races. Hispanic or Latino of any race were 3.37% of the population.

There were 94 households, of which 34.0% had children under the age of 18 living with them, 35.1% were married couples living together, 22.3% had a female householder with no husband present, 5.3% had a male householder with no wife present, and 37.2% were non-families. 28.7% of all households were made up of individuals, and 16% had someone living alone who was 65 years of age or older. The average household size was 2.54 and the average family size was 3.03.

The median age in the village was 37.1 years. 33% of residents were under the age of 18; 7.9% were between the ages of 18 and 24; 18.3% were from 25 to 44; 25.8% were from 45 to 64; and 15% were 65 years of age or older. The gender makeup of the village was 53.6% male and 46.4% female.

=== 2000 census ===
As of the census of 2000, there were 217 people, 84 households, and 58 families living in the village. The population density was 1,643.0 inhabitants per square mile (634.4/km^{2}). There were 92 housing units at an average density of 696.6 per square mile (269.0/km^{2}). The racial makeup of the village was 99.54% White and 0.46% African American. Hispanic or Latino of any race were 0.92% of the population.

There were 84 households, out of which 35.7% had children under the age of 18 living with them, 48.8% were married couples living together, 15.5% had a female householder with no husband present, and 29.8% were non-families. 27.4% of all households were made up of individuals, and 15.5% had someone living alone who was 65 years of age or older. The average household size was 2.58 and the average family size was 3.15.

In the village, the population was spread out, with 23.5% under the age of 18, 9.7% from 18 to 24, 29.0% from 25 to 44, 24.0% from 45 to 64, and 13.8% who were 65 years of age or older. The median age was 38 years. For every 100 females, there were 88.7 males. For every 100 females age 18 and over, there were 82.4 males.

The median income for a household in the village was $25,417, and the median income for a family was $27,292. Males had a median income of $23,750 versus $14,531 for females. The per capita income for the village was $10,351. About 14.5% of families and 18.0% of the population were below the poverty line, including 18.2% of those under the age of eighteen and 32.3% of those 65 or over.

== Education ==
It is in the Scott County Central Schools school district. The district's comprehensive high school is Scott County Central High School.

Three Rivers College's service area includes Scott County.

=== Historic area public schools ===
- Crowder School (1901 – c.1950) was located near the community of Crowder on State Highway Z.
- Vanduser High School (until 1959) merged with Morley High School to form Scott County Central High School. Vanduser High School's sports mascot name was the Yellow Jackets while Morley High School's sports mascot name was the Bears.
