= Boston Celtics =

National Basketball Association team in Boston, Massachusetts

- 2026–27 Boston Celtics season
- Conference: Eastern
- Division: Atlantic
- Founded: 1946
- History: Boston Celtics; 1946–present
- Arena: TD Garden
- Location: Boston, Massachusetts
- Team colors: Green, white, black, gold, brown
- Main sponsor: Amica Mutual Insurance
- CEO: Wyc Grousbeck
- President: Rich Gotham
- General manager: Brad Stevens
- Head coach: Joe Mazzulla
- Ownership: William Chisholm; Aditya Mittal
- Affiliation: Maine Celtics
- Championships: 18 (1957, 1959, 1960, 1961, 1962, 1963, 1964, 1965, 1966, 1968, 1969, 1974, 1976, 1981, 1984, 1986, 2008, 2024)
- Conference titles: 11 (1974, 1976, 1981, 1984, 1985, 1986, 1987, 2008, 2010, 2022, 2024)
- Division titles: 36 (1957, 1958, 1959, 1960, 1961, 1962, 1963, 1964, 1965, 1972, 1973, 1974, 1975, 1976, 1980, 1981, 1982, 1984, 1985, 1986, 1987, 1988, 1991, 1992, 2005, 2008, 2009, 2010, 2011, 2012, 2017, 2022, 2023, 2024, 2025, 2026)
- Retired numbers: 23 (00, 1, 2, 3, 5, 6, 10, 14, 15, 16, 17, 18, 19, 21, 22, 23, 24, 25, 31, 32, 33, 34, 35, LOSCY)
- Website: nba.com/celtics
Association	Icon	Statement

The Boston Celtics (/ˈsɛltɪks/ SEL-tiks (Note: The pronunciation of Celts with an initial /s/ (imported from French) was common at the time of the team's founding, but outside of organization names, is now pronounced with a /k/, as in Ancient Latin and Greek.)) are an American professional basketball team based in Boston. The Celtics compete in the National Basketball Association (NBA) as a member of the Atlantic Division of the Eastern Conference. Founded in 1946 as one of the league's original eight teams, the Celtics play their home games at TD Garden, a shared arena with the NHL's Boston Bruins. The Celtics are commonly regarded as the most successful team in NBA history. They hold the records for most NBA championships won, with 18, and for most recorded wins of any NBA franchise.

The Celtics' rise to dominance began in the late 1950s, after the team, led by coach Red Auerbach, acquired Bill Russell in 1956, later becoming the cornerstone of the Celtics dynasty. Led by Russell, Bob Cousy, and Tom Heinsohn, the Celtics won their first NBA championship in 1957. Russell, along with a talented supporting cast of future Hall of Famers including Heinsohn, Don Nelson, K. C. Jones, John Havlicek, Sam Jones, Satch Sanders, and Bill Sharman, would usher the Celtics into the greatest period in franchise history, winning eight consecutive NBA championships from 1959 to 1966. After Russell became the team's player-coach, as well as the first African American head coach in any United States sport, they won back-to-back titles in 1968 and 1969. The Celtics entered a period of rebuilding after Russell retired in 1969.

In the mid-1970s, the Celtics became contenders once again, winning championships in 1974 and 1976 under the leadership of head coach Tom Heinsohn with Dave Cowens, Havlicek, and Jo Jo White. In the 1980s, the Celtics returned to dominance. Anchored by the "Big Three" of Larry Bird, Kevin McHale, and Robert Parish, the team experienced a renewed rivalry with the "Showtime" Lakers and won championships in 1981, 1984, and 1986, the latter two with head coach K. C. Jones. After the retirements of Bird and McHale, the departure of Parish, and the untimely deaths of 1986 draft pick Len Bias and star player Reggie Lewis, the Celtics struggled through the 1990s and much of the early 2000s.

After another period of rebuilding, the Celtics assembled a new "Big Three" around team captain Paul Pierce by acquiring Ray Allen and Kevin Garnett in the 2007 off-season. Under the leadership of head coach Doc Rivers, the team defeated the Lakers to win their 17th championship in 2008, while also losing to the Lakers in the 2010 Finals. Allen, Garnett, and Pierce were no longer with the team by the start of the 2013–14 season, with Garnett and Pierce being traded to the Brooklyn Nets for four total future first-round picks. With two of these first-round picks, the team drafted Jaylen Brown and Jayson Tatum in 2016 and 2017, respectively. Led by "The Jays", the team returned to the NBA Finals in 2022, losing to the Golden State Warriors, and defeated the Dallas Mavericks in 2024 to secure their 18th championship.

The "Celtics" team name and the team's mascot "Lucky the Leprechaun" are nods to Boston's historically large Irish population, and also to the Original Celtics, a barnstorming basketball team that played in the early 20th century. The Celtics have a notable rivalry with the Los Angeles Lakers, who are second in NBA history with 17 championships. The teams' rivalry was especially pronounced in the 1960s and 1980s. The Celtics have played the Lakers a record 12 times in the NBA Finals and have defeated them nine times. 41 members of Basketball Hall of Fame have played for the Celtics at least once in their careers. Four Celtics players (Bob Cousy, Bill Russell, Dave Cowens and Larry Bird) have won the NBA Most Valuable Player award; overall, Celtics players have won an NBA-record 10 MVP awards.

In May 2025, the team was sold to private equity investor William Chisholm for $6.1 billion, making it the highest ever valued transaction for a sports franchise in North America. However, the Celtics' record was surpassed later in 2025 when the Los Angeles Lakers were valued at approximately $10 billion in the sale of a majority stake—making the Celtics' deal the second-highest valued sports franchise transaction in U.S. history.

== History ==
=== 1946–1950: Early years ===
The Boston Celtics were formed on June 6, 1946, by Boston Garden-Arena Corporation president Walter A. Brown as a team in the Basketball Association of America. In 1948, the team earned its first playoff appearance, only to lose to the Chicago Stags 4–1. In 1949, the team missed the playoffs, fifth in the Eastern Division. Then, on August 3, 1949, the team became part of the National Basketball Association after the merger of the BAA and rival National Basketball League. In 1950, the Celtics signed Chuck Cooper, becoming the first NBA franchise to draft a black player. Chuck Connors of The Rifleman fame was an original member of the Celtics in 1946.

=== 1950–1958: Arrival of Bob Cousy and Red Auerbach ===
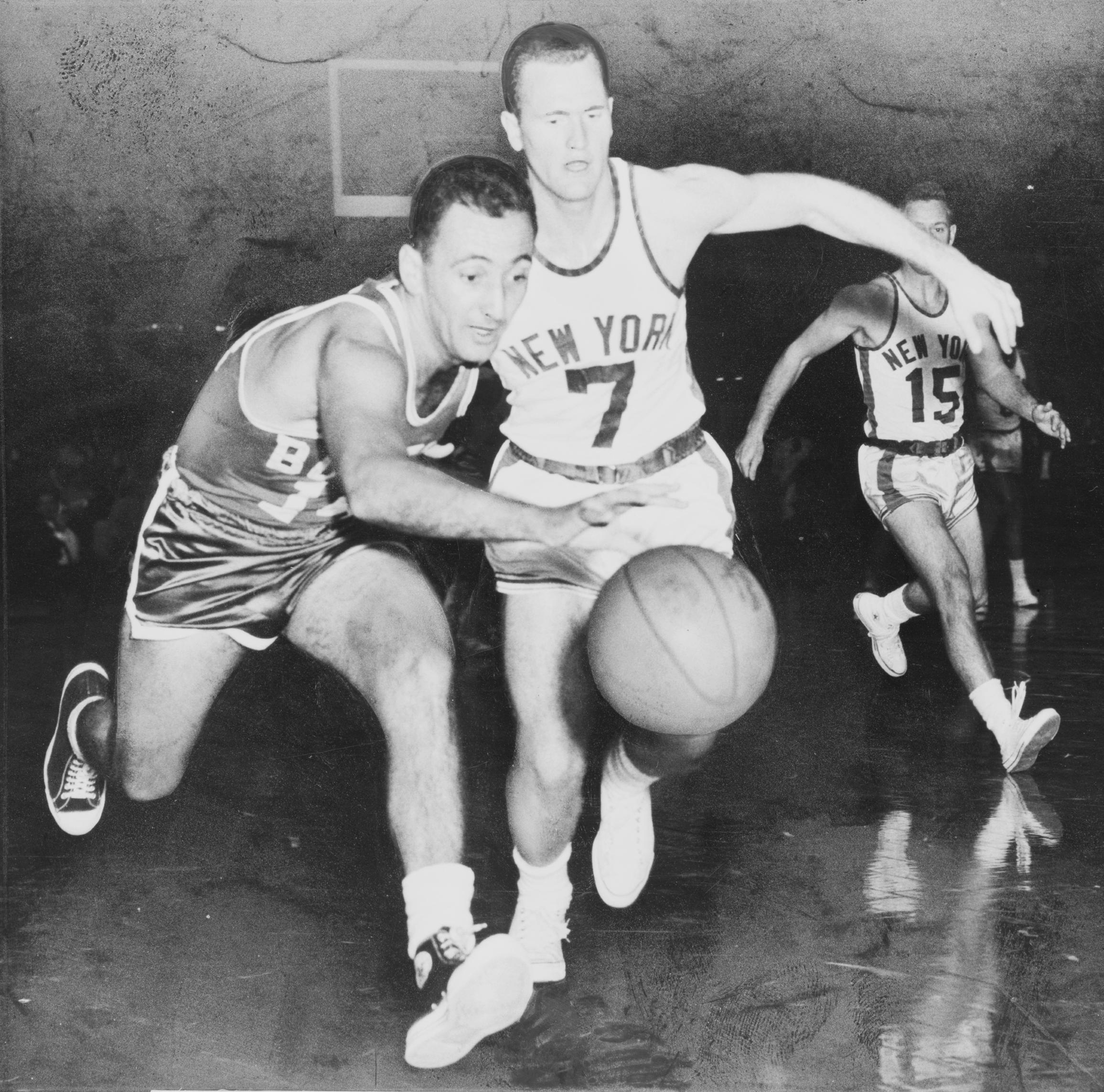
Bob Cousy played 13 years for the team, 6 of them ending in NBA titles

The Celtics struggled during their early years, until the hiring of coach Red Auerbach. In the franchise's early days, Auerbach had no assistants, ran all the practices, did all the scouting—both of opposing teams and college draft prospects—and scheduled all road trips. One of the first great players to join the Celtics was Bob Cousy, whom Auerbach initially refused to draft out of nearby Holy Cross because he was "too flashy". Cousy's contract eventually became the property of the Chicago Stags, but when that franchise went bankrupt, Cousy went to the Celtics in a dispersal draft.

After the 1955–56 season, Auerbach made a stunning trade, sending perennial All-Star Ed Macauley to the St. Louis Hawks along with the draft rights to Cliff Hagan for the second overall pick in the draft. After negotiating with the Rochester Royals—a negotiation that included a promise that the Celtics owner would send the highly sought-after Ice Capades to Rochester if the Royals would let Russell slide to No. 2—Auerbach used the pick to select University of San Francisco center Bill Russell. Auerbach also acquired Holy Cross standout, and 1957 NBA Rookie of the Year, Tom Heinsohn. Both Russell and Heinsohn worked extraordinarily well with Cousy, and they were the players around whom Auerbach would build the champion Celtics for more than a decade. With Bill Russell, the Celtics advanced to the 1957 NBA Finals and defeated the St. Louis Hawks in seven games, earning their first NBA title. In 1958, the Celtics again advanced to the NBA Finals, this time losing to the Hawks in six games.

=== 1958–1969: Bill Russell era and decade-long dynasty ===
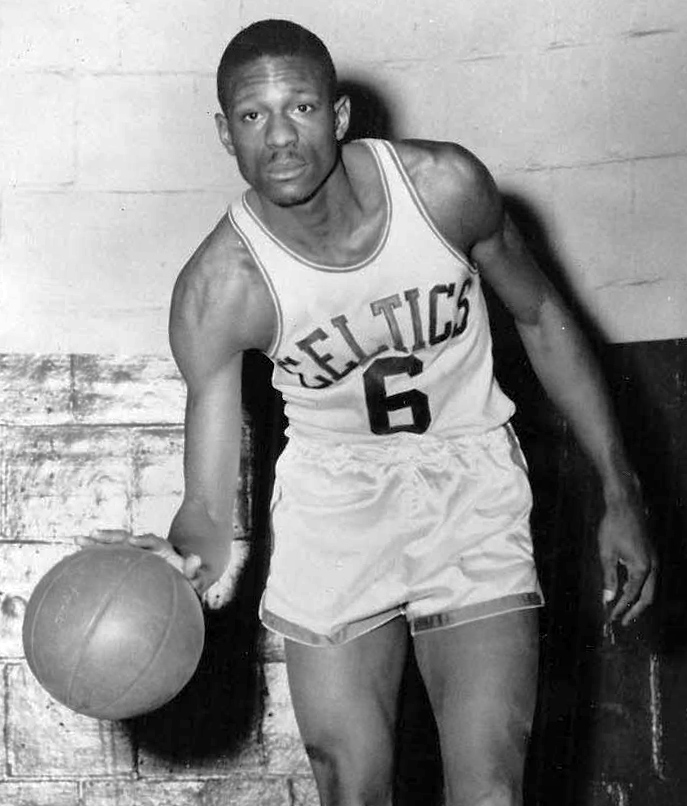
Bill Russell starred on 11 NBA title teams in 13 years as a Celtic

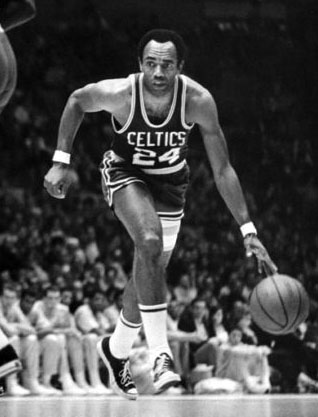
Sam Jones played with the Celtics (1957–1969) winning 10 titles

After the acquisition of K.C. Jones in 1958, the Celtics began a dynasty that would last for more than a decade. In 1959, the Celtics won the NBA championship after sweeping the Minneapolis Lakers, the first of their record eight consecutive championships. During that time, the Celtics met the Lakers in the Finals five times, starting an intense and often bitter rivalry that has spanned generations. In 1964, the Celtics became the first NBA team to have an all African-American starting lineup. On December 26, 1964, Willie Naulls replaced an injured Tom Heinsohn, joining Tom 'Satch' Sanders, K.C. Jones, Sam Jones, and Bill Russell in the starting lineup. The Celtics defeated St. Louis 97–84. Boston won its next 11 games with Naulls starting in place of Heinsohn. The Celtics of the late 1950s–1960s are widely considered one of the most dominant teams of all time.

Auerbach retired as coach after the 1965–66 season and Russell took over as player-coach, which was Auerbach's ploy to keep Russell interested. With his appointment Russell became the first African-American coach in any U.S. pro sport. Auerbach would remain the general manager, a position he would hold well into the 1980s. However, the Celtics' string of NBA titles ended when they lost to the Philadelphia 76ers in the 1967 Eastern Division finals. The aging team managed two more championships in 1968 and 1969, defeating the Los Angeles Lakers each time. Russell retired after the 1969 season, effectively ending a Celtics dynasty that had garnered an unrivaled 11 NBA titles in 13 seasons. The team's run of 8 consecutive is the longest championship streak in U.S. professional sports history, with Russell's 11 titles being the most won by an NBA player.

=== 1969–1978: Rebuilding and further success ===
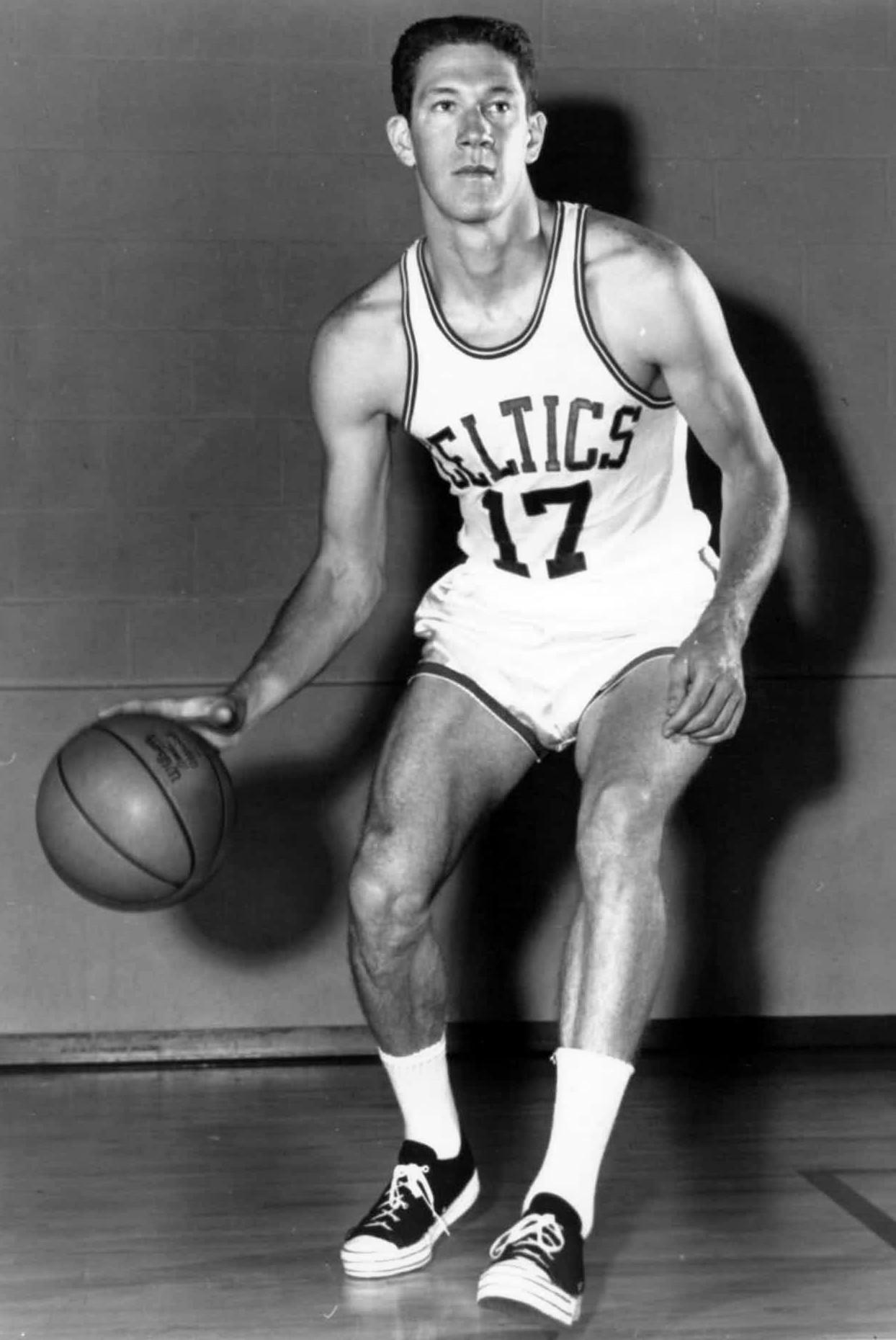
John Havlicek, 16 years with the Celtics

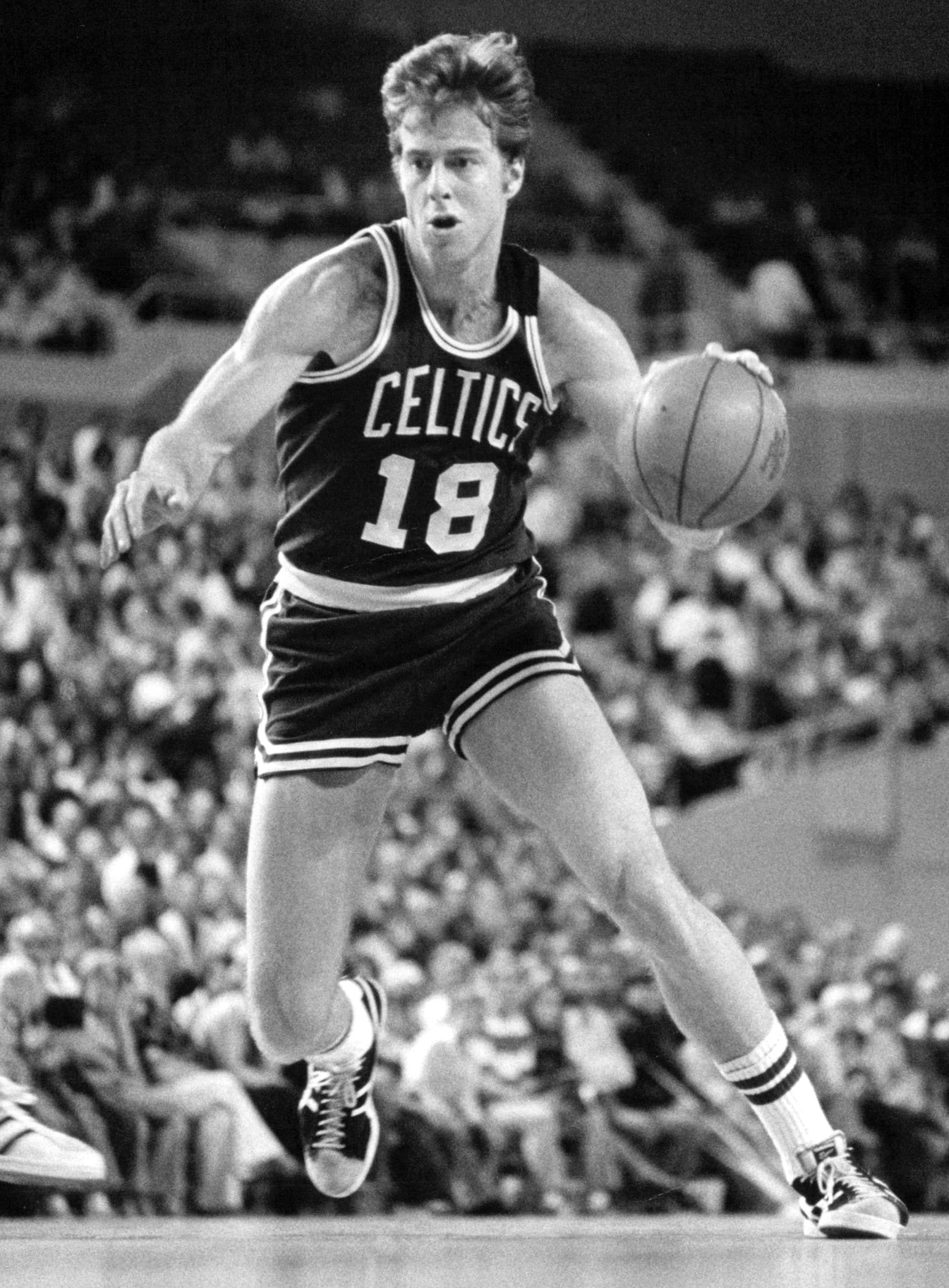
Dave Cowens, two titles and MVP in 1973

The 1969–70 season was a rebuilding year, as the Celtics had their first losing record since the 1949–50 season. However, with the acquisition of Paul Silas and future Hall of Famers Dave Cowens and Jo Jo White, the Celtics soon became dominant again. After losing in the Eastern Conference finals in 1972, the Celtics regrouped and came out determined in 1973 and posted an excellent 68–14 regular season record. But the season ended in disappointment, as they were upset in seven games by the New York Knicks in the conference finals. John Havlicek injured his right shoulder in game six and was forced to play game seven shooting left-handed. The Celtics returned to the playoffs the next year, defeating the Milwaukee Bucks in the 1974 NBA Finals for their 12th NBA championship. Boston took a 3–2 series lead and had a chance to claim the title on their home court. The Bucks won Game Six in Boston when Kareem Abdul-Jabbar nestled in a hook shot with 3 seconds left in the game's second overtime, and the series returned to Milwaukee. Cowens was the hero in game 7, scoring 28 points, as the Celtics brought the title back to Boston for the first time in five years.

In 1976, the team won yet another championship, defeating the Phoenix Suns in six games. The Finals featured one of the greatest games in NBA history. With the series tied at two games apiece, the Suns trailed early in the Boston Garden, but came back to force overtime. In double overtime, a Gar Heard turn-around jumper at the top of the key sent the game to a third overtime, at which point the Celtics prevailed. After the 1976 championship and a playoff appearance in 1977, Boston went into another rebuilding phase. In the 1977 NBA draft, the Celtics drafted a young forward from UNC Charlotte named Cedric Maxwell. "Cornbread" Maxwell did not contribute much in his rookie season, but he showed promise. Auerbach's job became even tougher after the 1977–78 season, in which they went 32–50, because Havlicek, the Celtics' all-time leading scorer, retired after 16 seasons.

The Celtics owned two of the top eight picks in the 1978 NBA draft. Auerbach took a risk by selecting junior Larry Bird of Indiana State with the sixth overall pick, knowing that Bird would stay in college for his senior year but believing that his potential would make him worth the wait. The team retained Bird's rights for one year and signed him soon after he led Indiana State to the NCAA championship game. In 1978, Celtics owner Irv Levin traded franchises with Buffalo Braves owner John Y. Brown Jr. Two weeks before the swap of franchises was made official, details of a six-player trade between the two teams were reported. Boston sent Freeman Williams, Kevin Kunnert, and Kermit Washington to the Braves for "Tiny" Archibald, Billy Knight, and Marvin Barnes. The move turned Boston fans against Brown, both because Kunnert and Washington were seen as key pieces of the team's future and because Auerbach publicly stated that he was not consulted about the trade.

=== 1979–1992: Larry Bird era ===
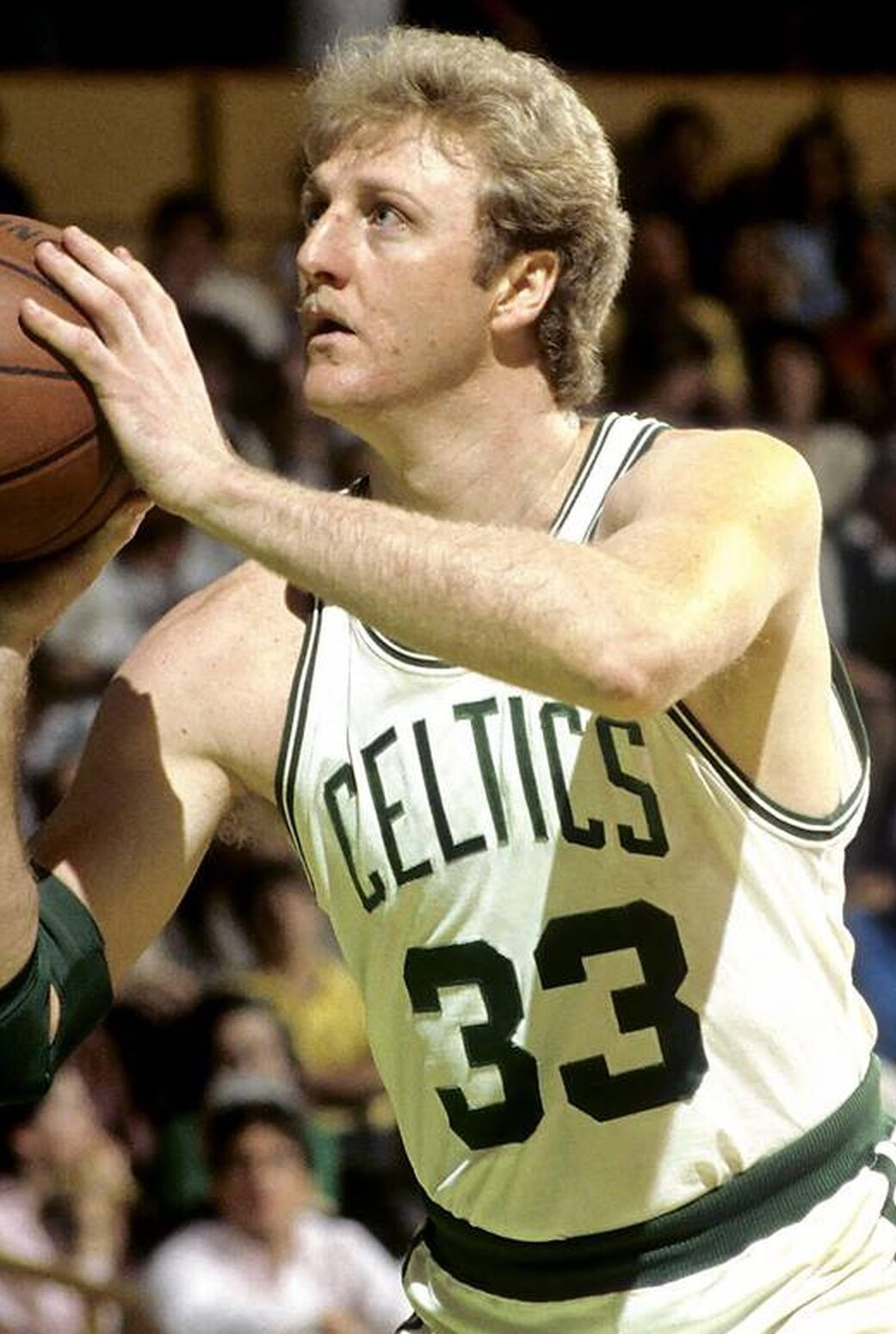
12 time All-Star Larry Bird played in the Celtics from 1979 to 1992. He is widely regarded as one of the greatest basketball players of all time.

The relationship between Brown and Auerbach worsened with Brown's decision to acquire Bob McAdoo in February 1979, in exchange for three first-round draft picks that Auerbach had planned to use to rebuild the franchise. Again, Brown made the trade without consulting Auerbach. Auerbach almost left Boston to take a job with the New York Knicks as a result. With public support strongly behind Auerbach, Brown sold the team to Harry Mangurian in 1979 rather than run the risk of losing his famed general manager. The Celtics would struggle through the season, going 29–53. Newcomers Chris Ford, Rick Robey, Cedric Maxwell and Nate Archibald failed to reverse the team's momentum.

Larry Bird debuted for the Celtics during the 1979–80 season. With a new owner in place, Auerbach made a number of moves that would bring the team back to prominence. He almost immediately traded McAdoo, a former NBA scoring champion, to the Detroit Pistons for guard M. L. Carr, a defensive specialist, and two first-round picks in the 1980 NBA draft. He also picked up point guard Gerald Henderson from the CBA. Carr, Archibald, Henderson and Ford formed a highly competent backcourt, blending in well with the talented frontcourt of Cowens, Maxwell and Bird. With Bird winning NBA Rookie of the Year honors the team went 61–21, a 32-game improvement from the previous season. Playing strong in the playoffs, the Celtics fell to the Philadelphia 76ers in the conference finals.

After the season, Auerbach completed one of the most lopsided trades in NBA history, garnering a pair of future Hall of Famers for a pair of first-round draft picks. Seeking to improve the team immediately, Auerbach sent the team's two first-round draft picks to the Golden State Warriors for both center Robert Parish and the Warriors' first-round pick. He then used the pick the Celtics obtained from Golden State to select University of Minnesota power forward Kevin McHale. The "Big Three" of Bird, McHale and Parish played together for the Celtics until 1992, won three NBA championships together, and were later described as the best NBA frontcourt of all time.

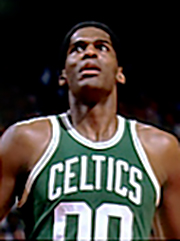
Robert Parish, during his 14-year tenure with the Celtics, received 9 All-Star selections.

Despite losing center Dave Cowens to retirement late in training camp, the Celtics went 62–20 under coach Bill Fitch in 1980–81. Once again, the Celtics faced the 76ers in the Eastern Conference finals, falling behind 3–1 before coming back to win Game Seven, 91–90. The Celtics went on to win the 1981 NBA championship over the Houston Rockets, with Maxwell being named NBA Finals MVP.

After the 1981–82 season, the Celtics once again met the 76ers in the playoffs. This time, they lost in seven games. In 1983 the Celtics were swept in the playoffs (a first for the franchise) by the Milwaukee Bucks; afterwards, Fitch resigned and the team was sold to new owners led by Don Gaston.

In 1983–84, the Celtics under new coach K. C. Jones would go 62–20 and return to the NBA Finals after a three-year hiatus. Boston came back from a 2–1 deficit to defeat the Lakers for their 15th championship. Bird renewed his college rivalry with Lakers star Magic Johnson during this series. After the season, Auerbach officially retired as general manager, but maintained the position of team president. He was succeeded by Jan Volk.

In 1985, the Lakers and Celtics met again in the Finals, with the Lakers winning. This was the first time the Lakers had defeated the Celtics in the Finals and the only time the team had won a championship at Boston Garden. In the off-season, the Celtics acquired Bill Walton from the Los Angeles Clippers in exchange for Cedric Maxwell. Walton had been an All-Star and league MVP while leading the Portland Trail Blazers to the 1977 NBA championship, but injuries had hobbled him since. Considered the best passing center in NBA history, he stayed healthy and was a big part of the Celtics' success in 1986.

Kevin McHale shoots over Hakeem Olajuwon in the 1986 NBA Finals

The Celtics won the second pick in the 1986 NBA draft and drafted University of Maryland star Len Bias, one of the most heralded prospects of his era. Bias died 36 hours later of an accidental cocaine overdose. Despite the tragedy, the Celtics remained competitive in 1986–87, going 59–23 and again winning the Eastern Conference Championship. They were defeated in the Finals by the Lakers in six games.

In 1988, the Celtics lost in six games to the Detroit Pistons in the conference finals. After the season, head coach K.C. Jones retired and was replaced by assistant Jimmy Rodgers. Boston's hopes for 1988–89 faded when Bird underwent a procedure to remove bone spurs in his feet early in the season, and the Celtics won just 42 games before a first-round playoff defeat to the Pistons. Bird returned in 1989–90 and led the Celtics to a 52–30 record. In the playoffs, the Celtics collapsed after winning the first two games in a best-of-five series against the New York Knicks, losing three straight games and the series. After the playoffs, Rodgers was fired and replaced by assistant coach and former Celtics player Chris Ford.

Under Ford's leadership, the Celtics improved to 56–26 in 1990–91, recapturing the Atlantic Division title even though Bird missed 22 games with several injuries. The Celtics again lost to the Pistons in the playoffs. In 1992, a late-season rally allowed a 51–31 Celtics team to catch the New York Knicks and repeat as Atlantic Division champions. After sweeping the Indiana Pacers in the first round, the Celtics lost a seven-game conference semifinals series to the Cleveland Cavaliers. Back injuries limited Bird to only 45 regular season games, and just four of ten in the playoffs. After thirteen NBA seasons and a gold medal at the Barcelona Olympics with the Dream Team, continued back trouble led Bird to retire in 1992.

=== 1993–1998: Tragedy and decline ===
The loss of Bird and the aging of the team's other veteran stars forced coach Chris Ford into rebuilding mode. Hopes centered on 26-year-old Reggie Lewis, a small forward out of Boston's Northeastern University. In the first round of the 1993 playoffs Lewis fainted during Boston's four-game series loss by the Charlotte Hornets. An examination revealed heart problems, but Lewis was able to get doctors to clear him for a comeback. Before he could make it he died of a heart attack while shooting baskets at Brandeis University during the off-season. The Celtics honored his memory by retiring his number 35. With McHale having retired after the Celtics' playoff loss to the Hornets, Boston's original Big 3 era came to an end in 1994 upon Robert Parish's signing with Charlotte. The team collapsed, finishing out of the playoffs with a 32–50 mark.

In 1994, the Celtics hired former player and legendary towel-waving cheerleader M. L. Carr as the team's new vice president of basketball operations. Working alongside general manager Jan Volk, Carr selected University of North Carolina star Eric Montross with Boston's first-round pick in the 1994 NBA draft. Montross became the new heir apparent in the paint, but failed to develop and was eventually traded. 1994–95 was the Celtics' final season in the Boston Garden. The Celtics signed aging Dominique Wilkins as a free agent, who led the team in scoring with 17.8 PPG. Second-year player Dino Rađa, a power forward from Croatia, added an interior presence the team had been lacking in 1993–94. The Celtics made the playoffs, losing to the heavily favored Orlando Magic in four games. In 1995, the Celtics moved from the Boston Garden to the Fleet Center (later TD BankNorth, then TD Garden). Carr fired Chris Ford and took the coaching reins himself. After drafting Providence College star Eric Williams, the Celtics struggled to a 33–49 record.

Things got worse in 1996–97 as the Celtics lost a franchise-record 67 games, setting an unwanted NBA record winning only once against other Atlantic Division teams and just fifteen victories overall. In spite of the emergence of first-round draft pick Antoine Walker, Carr resigned after the season ended, while Rick Pitino was hired to join the franchise as the team's president, director of basketball operations, and head coach, reportedly on a $70 million ten-year contract. Volk resigned on May 7, 1997. Pitino's appointment as team president was controversial as Auerbach, the incumbent who had filled that role for more than 25 years, first heard about the change from local media. Unfortunately for the franchise, Pitino was not the savior everyone hoped he would be. Auerbach bore the insult of being elbowed out with dignity, even as the team failed to improve.

The Celtics received the third and sixth draft picks in the 1997 NBA draft, and used the picks to select a brand new backcourt through Chauncey Billups and Ron Mercer. The young team that lost 67 games the year before was dismantled, with David Wesley, Dino Rađa and Rick Fox being let go, and Williams traded to the Denver Nuggets for a pair of second-round draft picks (Williams would return to the Celtics in 1999 and played for four years). Walter McCarty was also acquired in a trade with the Knicks. With a promising start, upsetting the defending champions Chicago Bulls at home on opening night, and hard play from the youngsters that led to leaderships in turnovers and steals, the team improved its victories from 15 to 36 despite many losing streaks. Billups was subsequently traded to the Raptors during his rookie year, and Mercer was traded to the Nuggets during his third season.

=== 1998–2013: Paul Pierce era ===
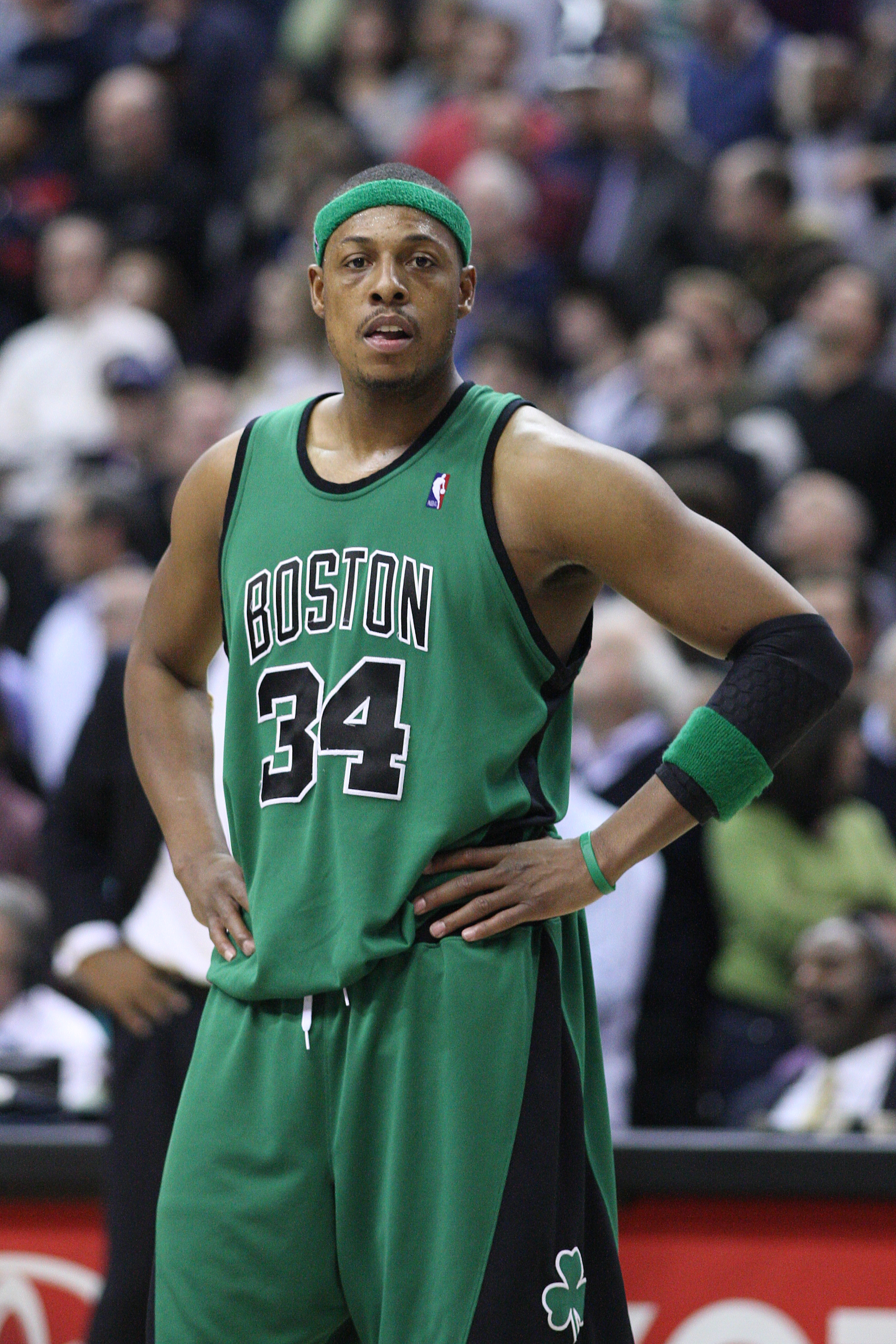
Drafted by the Celtics in 1998, Paul Pierce went on to star for the Celtics and later won the NBA Finals MVP Award when the team won the NBA championship in 2008

The following year in the 1998 NBA draft, the Celtics drafted Paul Pierce, a college star who had been expected to be drafted much earlier than the Celtics' 10th overall pick. During the lockout-shortened 1998–99 season, Pierce averaged 19.5 points; he was named Rookie of The Month in February, when he led the league in steals. However, the Celtics continued to struggle. After Boston lost to the Toronto Raptors on March 1, 2000, on a buzzer-beater by Vince Carter, Pitino delivered the memorable "walking through that door" speech, invoking Bird, McHale and Parish, frequently cited over the years as a reality check for organizations wrestling with bygone glory.

Pitino resigned in January 2001, when the team's record stood at 12–21. Jim O'Brien, who was named Pitino's interim replacement, finished the 2000–01 season 24–24. O'Brien was given the job of head coach permanently. Paul Pierce matured into an NBA star and was ably complemented by Antoine Walker and the other players acquired over the years. As a result of numerous trades, the Celtics had three picks in the 2001 NBA draft. They selected Joe Johnson, Joe Forte, and Kedrick Brown. Only Johnson managed to succeed in the NBA, becoming a perennial All-Star after leaving the Celtics.

The Celtics entered the 2001–02 season with low expectations. The team's late success in 2000–01 was largely forgotten, and critics were surprised when the team, along with the New Jersey Nets, surged to the top of the Atlantic Division ahead of the Philadelphia 76ers, who were fresh off a trip to the NBA Finals. The Celtics won a hard-fought 5-game series with the 76ers in the first round, 3–2. Pierce scored 46 points in the series-clinching game at the Fleet Center. In the conference semifinals, the Celtics defeated the favored Detroit Pistons 4–1. In their first trip to the conference finals since 1988, the Celtics jumped out to a 2–1 series lead over the Nets, after rallying from 21 points down in the fourth quarter to win game 3, but would lose the next three games to fall 4–2.

==== 2003–2007: New ownership and arrival of Doc Rivers ====
In 2003, the Celtics were sold by owner Paul Gaston to Boston Basketball Partners L.L.C., led by H. Irving Grousbeck, Wycliffe Grousbeck and Steve Pagliuca. The team made it back to the playoffs but were swept by the Nets in the second round, despite bringing game 4 to double overtime. Before their elimination, the team hired former Celtics' guard Danny Ainge as general manager, moving Chris Wallace to another position in the organization. Ainge believed the team had reached its peak and promptly sent Antoine Walker to the Dallas Mavericks (along with Tony Delk). In return, the Celtics received the often-injured Raef LaFrentz, Chris Mills, Jiří Welsch, and a first-round pick in 2004. The Celtics made the playoffs, only to be swept in the first round by the Indiana Pacers, losing all four games.

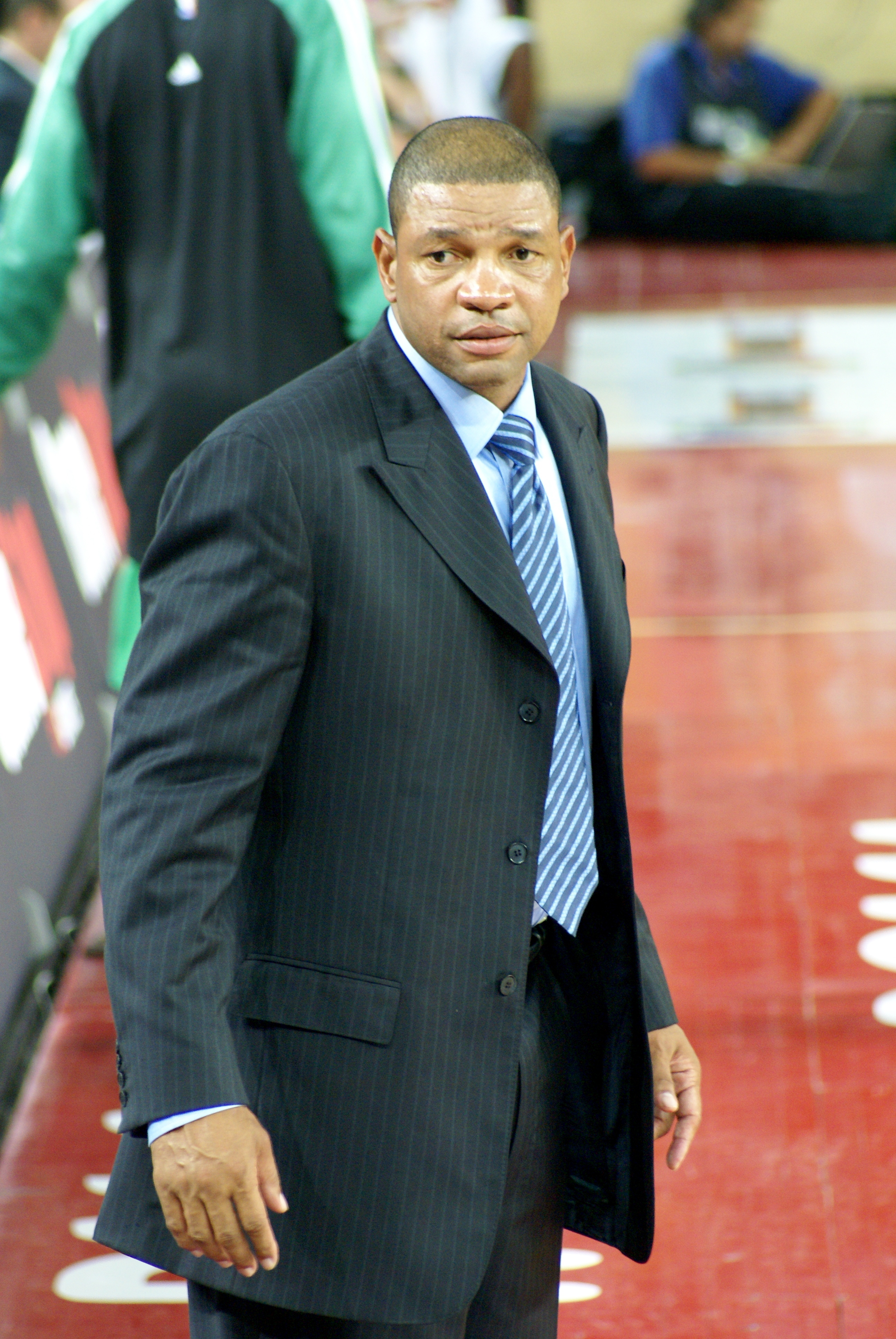
Head coach Doc Rivers led the Celtics to an NBA title in 2008.

The Celtics were a young team under new coach Doc Rivers during the 2004–05 season, having drafted youngsters Al Jefferson, Delonte West and Tony Allen in the 2004 Draft. Yet they seemed to have a core of good young players, led by Pierce and rookie Al Jefferson, to go along with a group of able veterans. The Celtics went 45–37 and won their first Atlantic Division title since 1991–92, receiving a boost from returning star Antoine Walker in mid-season. The Pacers defeated them in the first round yet again, with the series culminating in an embarrassing 27-point loss in game 7 at the Fleet Center. After the season Walker was traded again, this time to the Miami Heat. Despite Pierce's career season, in which he averaged career-highs in points (26.8), the Celtics missed the playoffs with a 33–49 record, owing largely to a young roster and constant roster shuffling, which saw the likes of Marcus Banks, Ricky Davis and Mark Blount traded for underachieving former first-overall pick Michael Olowokandi and former all-star Wally Szczerbiak.

The Celtics continued to rebuild in the 2006 NBA draft. The Celtics selected Kentucky point guard Rajon Rondo, who was to become a key piece in the team's revival. In the second round the Celtics added center Leon Powe. The 2006–07 season was a gloomy one for the franchise, starting with the death of Red Auerbach at 89. Auerbach was one of the few remaining people who had been a part of the NBA since its inception in 1946. The Celtics went 2–22 from late December 2006 through early February 2007 after losing Pierce to injury, the result of a stress reaction in his left foot. At first, the Celtics received a much-needed boost from guard Tony Allen but he tore his ACL and MCL on a needless dunk attempt after the whistle. The Celtics compiled a record of 24–58, second-worst in the NBA, including a franchise-record 18-game losing streak. At the end of the season, the Celtics, with the second-worst record in the NBA, were at least hopeful that they could secure a high draft pick and select either Greg Oden or Kevin Durant to help rebuild the franchise, but the Celtics fell to fifth in the Draft Lottery.

==== 2007–2012: "Big Three" era with Pierce, Allen, and Garnett ====
In the summer of 2007, general manager Danny Ainge made a series of moves that returned the Celtics to prominence. On draft night, he traded No. 5 pick Jeff Green, Wally Szczerbiak and Delonte West to Seattle for perennial All-Star Ray Allen and Seattle's second-round pick, which the team used to select LSU's Glen "Big Baby" Davis. The Celtics then traded Ryan Gomes, Gerald Green, Al Jefferson, Theo Ratliff, Sebastian Telfair, and a first-round draft pick to the Timberwolves in exchange for superstar power forward Kevin Garnett. These moves created a new "Big Three" of Pierce, Allen, and Garnett.

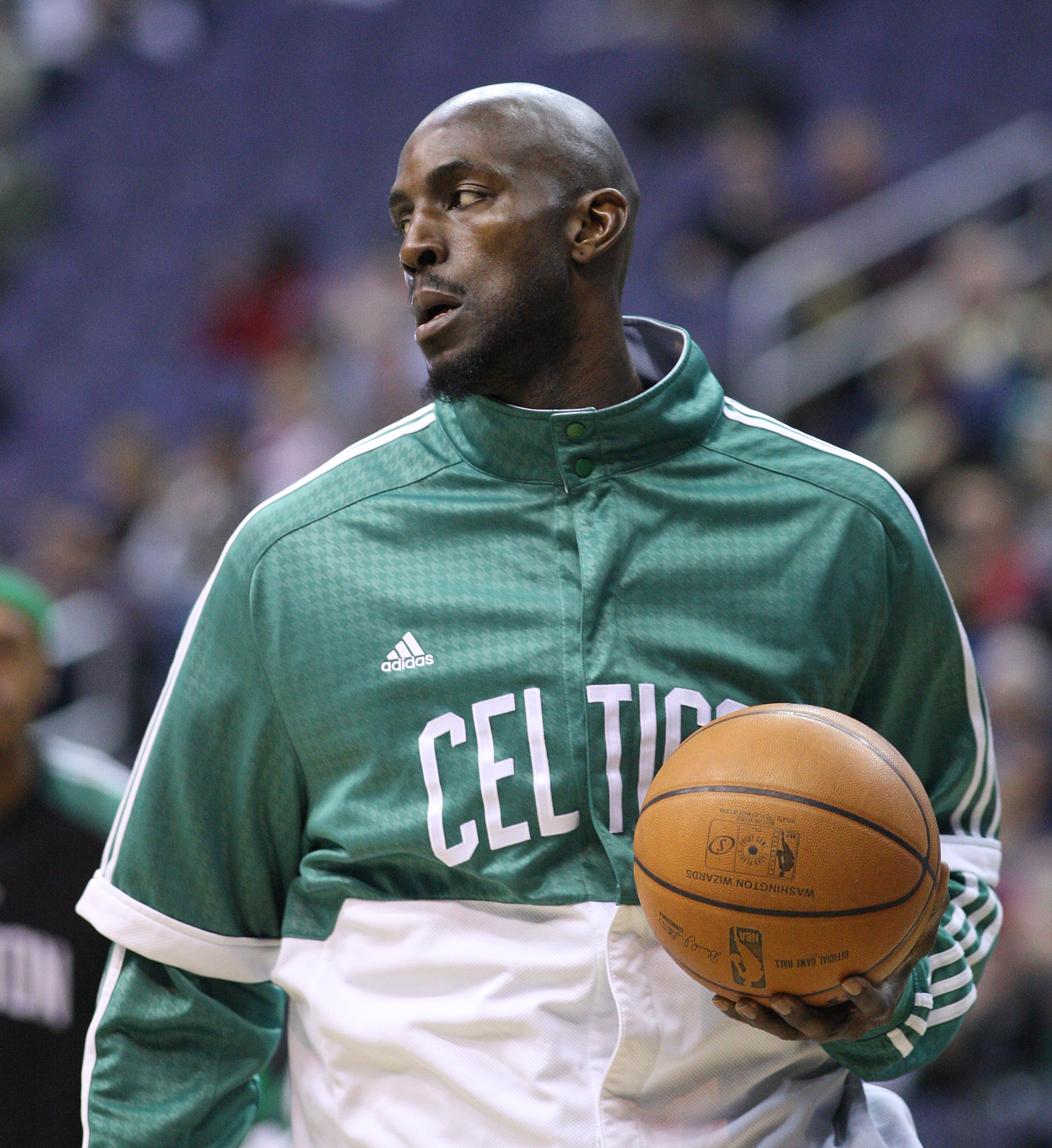
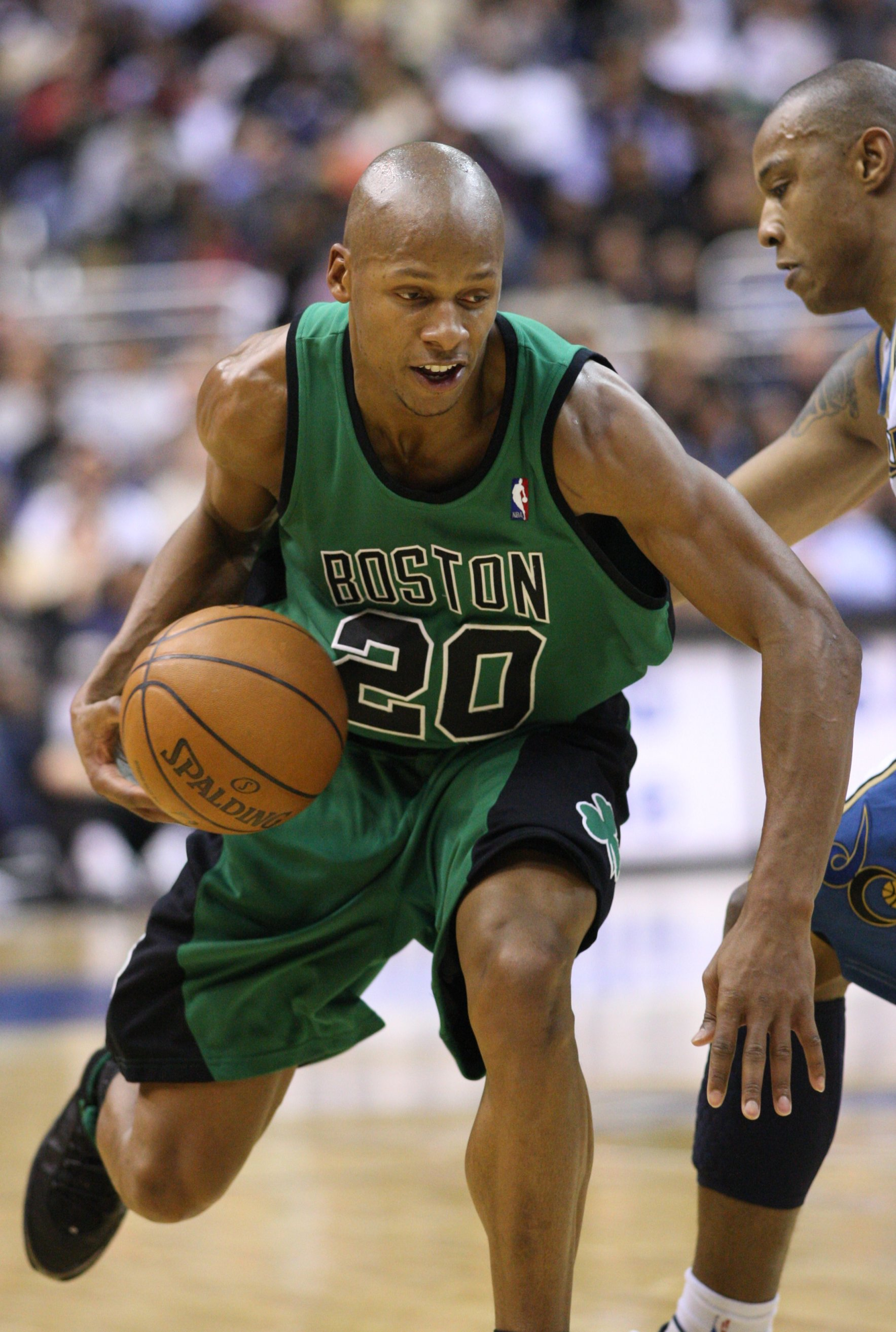
Kevin Garnett and Ray Allen were key players in the Celtics' 2008 NBA title victory

In the 2007–08 season, Celtics completed the largest single-season turnaround in NBA history. The team went 66–16 in the regular season, a 42-game improvement over its 2006–07 record. However, the team struggled in the early rounds of the playoffs, needing seven games to defeat the Atlanta Hawks in the first round and another seven to defeat the Cleveland Cavaliers in the conference semifinals. The Celtics then beat the Detroit Pistons in six games in the conference finals, winning two road games.

For the 11th time in league history, and for the first time since 1987, the Celtics and the Lakers faced off in the NBA Finals. The Celtics won Game One at home 98–88, fueled by strong play by Garnett and Pierce's dramatic comeback from a second-half knee injury. They won Game Two 108–102 despite nearly blowing a 24-point lead in the fourth quarter. As the series shifted to Los Angeles, the Lakers stifled Pierce and Garnett in Game Three and won 87–81. However, the Celtics would overcome a 24-point deficit in game 4 to win 97–91, making the largest comeback in NBA Finals history until Game 4 of the 2026 Finals. After again blowing a large lead, the Lakers hung on to win game 5 103–98, sending the series back to Boston. In game 6, the Celtics overpowered the Lakers, winning 131–92 and clinching their 17th NBA title. Paul Pierce was named Finals MVP. With the win the Celtics set a record for most games a team had ever played in a postseason with 26.

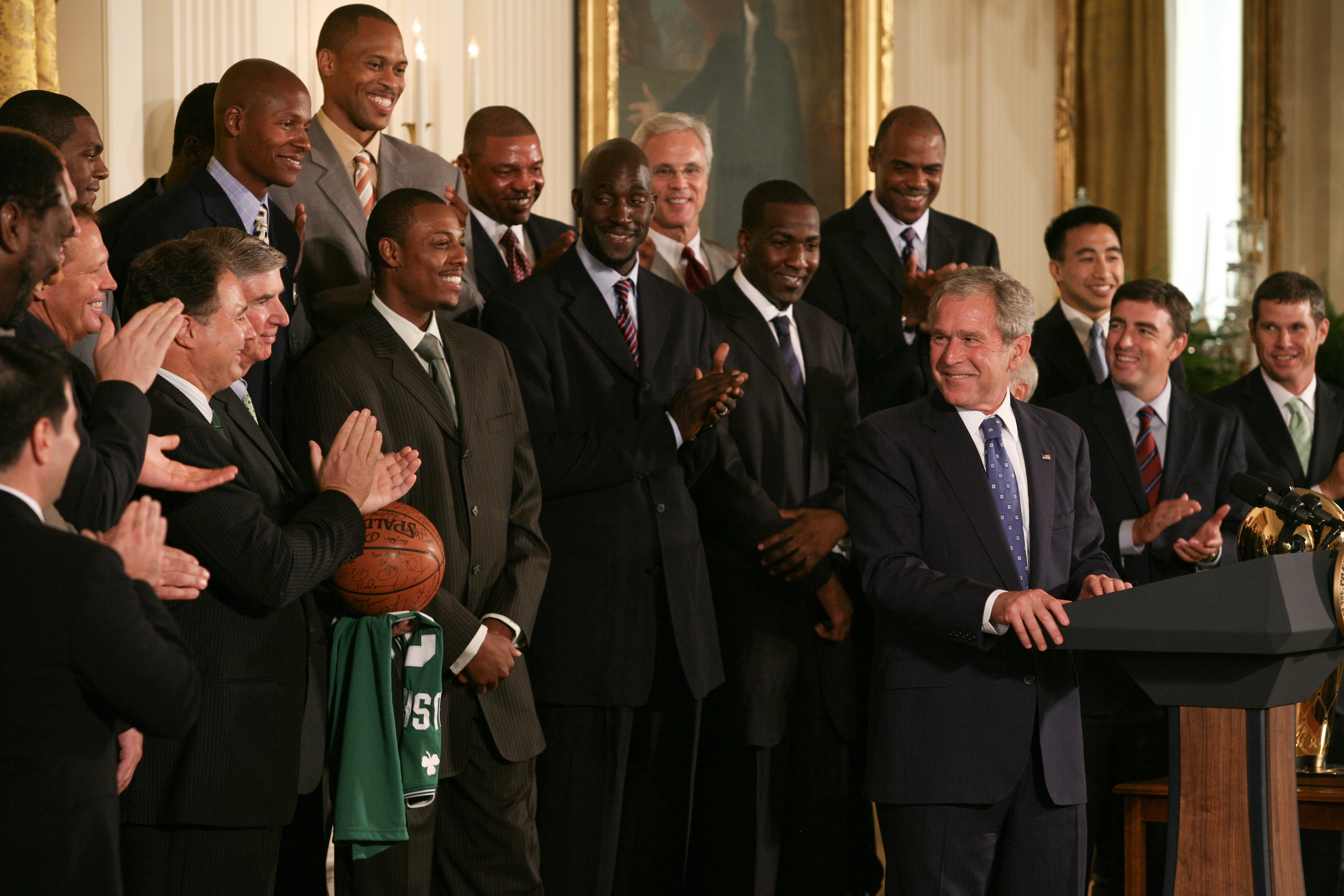
The 2008 NBA Champion Boston Celtics with President George W. Bush

The 2008–09 Celtics started off the season at 27–2, the then-best starting record in NBA history. They also had a franchise-record 19-game streak. After the All-Star Break, Kevin Garnett was injured in a loss against the Utah Jazz and missed the last 25 games of the season. Garnett was eventually shelved for the playoffs. The 2009 Celtics still finished with 62 victories, but their playoff run would end against the Magic in the second round.

In 2009, with the return of Garnett from injury and the additions of Rasheed Wallace and Marquis Daniels, the Celtics started the season 23–5 and at one point had the best record in the NBA. However, Doc Rivers decided to lessen his aging stars' minutes to keep them fresh for the playoffs. As a result, the Celtics sputtered to an even 27–27 record the rest of the way and finished the 2009–10 regular season with a 50–32 record. Despite being the fourth seed in the Eastern Conference, the Celtics managed to make the NBA Finals. Rajon Rondo emerged as a star during postseason play. For the 12th time, the Celtics faced the Lakers in the Finals. After taking a 3–2 lead heading into Los Angeles for Game Six, the Celtics appeared poised to win their 18th title. However, starting center Kendrick Perkins suffered a severe knee injury early in Game Six, and the Celtics went on to lose the series in seven games.

During the 2010 off-season, with Perkins expected to be out until February 2011, the Celtics signed two former All-Star centers, Shaquille O'Neal and Jermaine O'Neal. Shaquille O'Neal's presence wound up leading to Perkins' departure: the Celtics were 33–10 in games Perkins had missed during the year due to injury and had a 19–3 record in games when O'Neal played over 20 minutes. Consequently, Perkins was traded to the Oklahoma City Thunder in February, when the Celtics were 41–14 and led the Eastern Conference despite another rash of injuries. Following the trade, however, they proceeded to win only 15 of their final 27 games. They finished with a 56–26 record, sliding to the third seed. The 2010–11 season still provided three landmarks: The Celtics became the second team to reach 3,000 victories, Paul Pierce became the third Celtic to score 20,000 points (the others are Larry Bird and John Havlicek), and Ray Allen broke the NBA record for most career three-pointers. The 2011 NBA playoffs started with the Celtics sweeping the New York Knicks 4–0 in the opening round. In the second round, they were ousted by eventual Eastern Conference champions Miami Heat in five games. Shaquille O'Neal, limited to 12 minutes in two games of the second round, retired at the end of the season.

The Celtics started the lockout-shortened season 0–3, as Pierce was out with a heel injury. At the All-Star break, the Celtics were below .500 with a 15–17 record. However, they were one of the hottest teams in the league after the break, going 24–10 the rest of the year and winning their fifth division title in a row. The Celtics made the playoffs as the fourth seed in the Eastern Conference. In the playoffs, the Celtics faced the Atlanta Hawks in the first round, beating them in six games led by strong play from Pierce and Garnett. In the conference semifinals, the Celtics defeated the 76ers in seven games. The Celtics faced the Miami Heat in the conference finals, losing in seven games to the eventual NBA champions.

The 2012 off-season started with the Celtics having only six players under contract. While Kevin Garnett was signed to a new contract, Ray Allen signed with the Miami Heat for less money than the Celtics offered; this move brought the five-year "Big Three" era to a somewhat acrimonious end. The Celtics finished the season with 41 wins. The Celtics trailed the New York Knicks 3–0 in the first round of the 2013 NBA playoffs before losing the series in six games. In Game Six, the Celtics nearly completed a comeback when they went on a 20–0 run to cut the lead to four.

=== 2013–2016: Rebuilding years ===
During the off-season, head coach Doc Rivers was allowed to terminate his contract. He departed the Celtics to coach the Los Angeles Clippers, and the Celtics received a 2015 unprotected first-round pick as compensation. A few days later, Pierce, Garnett (who waived a no-trade clause), Jason Terry, and D. J. White, were traded to the Brooklyn Nets for Keith Bogans, MarShon Brooks, Kris Humphries, Kris Joseph, Gerald Wallace, and three future first-round draft picks (2014, 2016, 2018), together with the right to swap 2017 first-round picks with Brooklyn. The deal marked the start of a youth movement for the team.

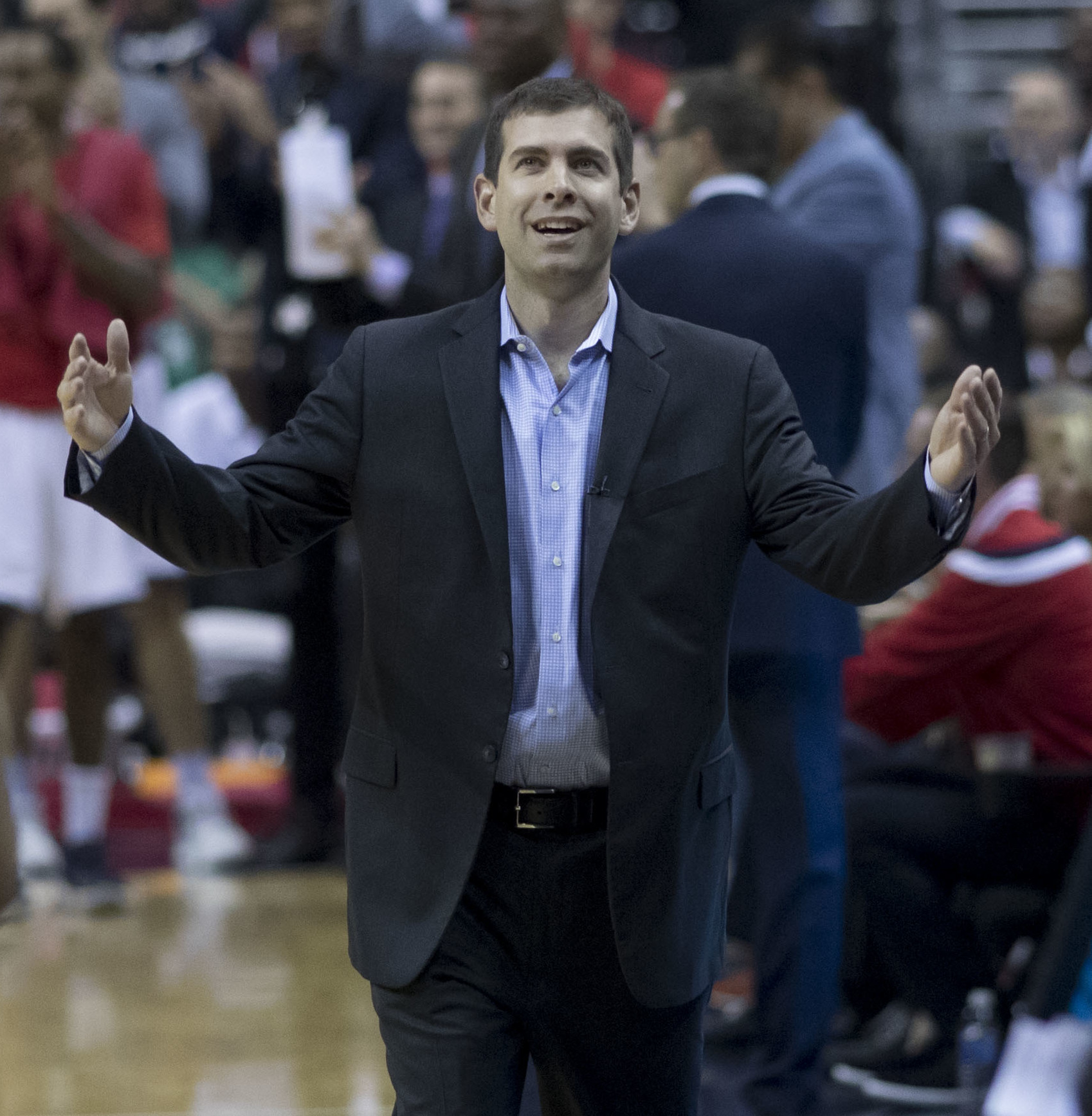
Brad Stevens, former head coach of the Celtics.

On July 3, 2013, the Celtics announced that Brad Stevens, the head coach of Butler University, would replace Doc Rivers as head coach. Halfway through the season, in January, Rajon Rondo made his return and was named the 15th Team Captain in team history, and the team furthered the youth movement by acquiring two draft picks in a three-team trade that sent Jordan Crawford and MarShon Brooks to the Golden State Warriors while the Celtics received the Heat center Joel Anthony. The 2013–14 season marked the Celtics' first missed playoffs since the "Big Three".

The next off-season, the Celtics drafted Marcus Smart with the sixth overall pick and James Young with the 17th overall pick in the 2014 NBA draft, and signed Evan Turner. The 2014–15 season had several roster moves, the most prominent being Rondo and rookie Dwight Powell traded to the Dallas Mavericks for center Brandan Wright, forward Jae Crowder, veteran point guard Jameer Nelson, and future picks. A total of 22 players spent time with the Celtics, leading scorer and rebounder Sullinger suffered a season-ending left metatarsal stress fracture, and the team was only tenth in the East with 28 games remaining. However, midseason acquisition Isaiah Thomas helped the team win 22 of their last 34 games, finishing the season with a 40–42 record, enough for the seventh seed in the Eastern Conference Playoffs. The Celtics were swept by the second seeded Cleveland Cavaliers in the first round.

In the 2015 NBA draft Boston selected Terry Rozier, R.J. Hunter, Jordan Mickey, and Marcus Thornton with the 16th, 28th, 33rd, and 45th selections respectively. During the off-season, the Celtics signed forward Amir Johnson and traded Gerald Wallace and Chris Babb in exchange for Warriors forward David Lee. The Celtics finished the 2015–16 NBA season with a 48–34 record, earning the fifth seed in the Eastern Conference. They played the fourth seed Atlanta Hawks in the first round of the playoffs. After leading by 3 points in the fourth quarter of game 1, guard Avery Bradley went down with a hamstring injury, making him sit out for the rest of the series. The Celtics lost the series 4–2 to the Hawks, ending their season.

=== 2016–2026: Tatum–Brown era ("the Jays") ===
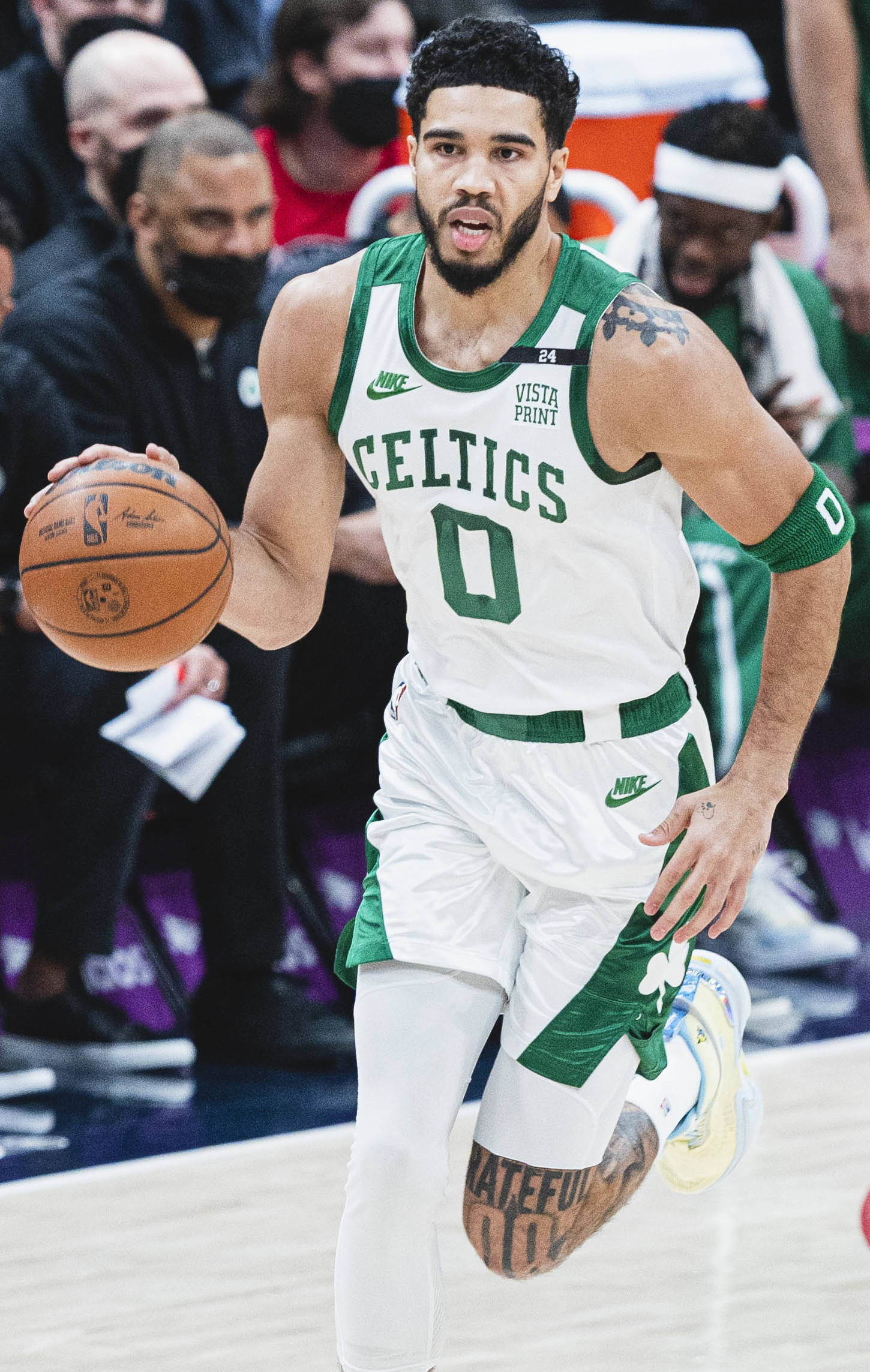
Jayson Tatum

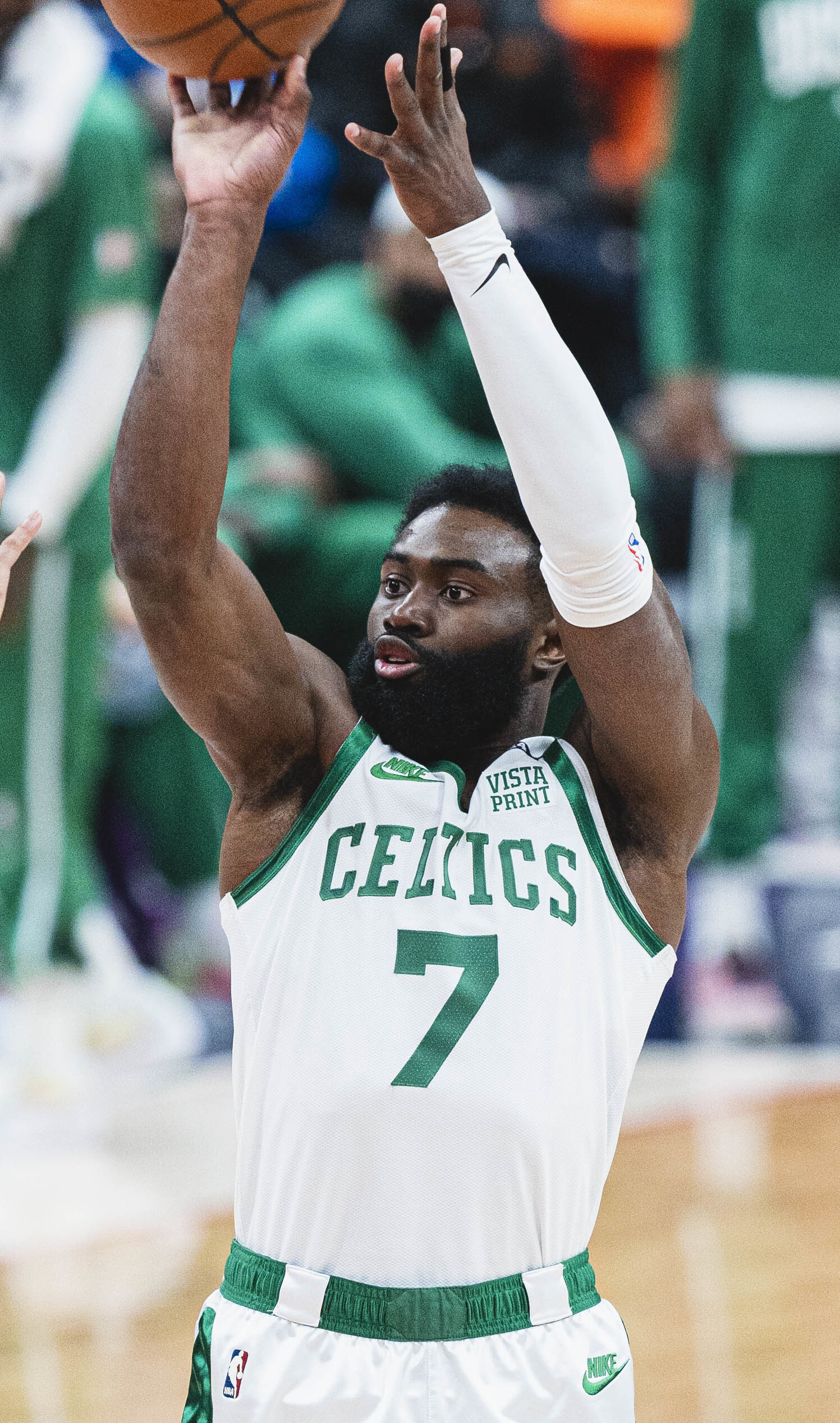
Jaylen Brown

In the 2016 NBA draft, the Celtics selected Jaylen Brown with the third pick. On July 8, 2016, the team signed four-time All-Star Al Horford. The Celtics finished the 2016–17 season with a 53–29 record and clinched the top seed in the Eastern Conference. After a hip injury ended Thomas' playoff run in game 2 of the conference finals, the Celtics eventually lost to the Cavaliers in five games. Isaiah Thomas was selected for his second straight All-Star game and first All-NBA selection, finishing third in the league in scoring and fifth in MVP voting. For the 2017 NBA draft, the Celtics won the draft lottery, earning them the first pick. (Note: This pick originally belonged to the Brooklyn Nets, but was sent to the Celtics in the 2013 trade involving Paul Pierce and Kevin Garnett. The Nets had the worst record in the previous season, which gave the Celtics the highest chance of winning the lottery.) They were projected to select freshman guard Markelle Fultz, but the pick was subsequently traded to the Philadelphia 76ers in exchange for the third pick in the 2017 draft and future picks. The 76ers would go on to draft Fultz, while the Celtics used the third pick to select freshman forward Jayson Tatum. During the off-season, the team signed Gordon Hayward. On August 22, 2017, the Celtics agreed to a deal that sent Isaiah Thomas, Jae Crowder, Ante Žižić, and the Brooklyn Nets' 2018 first-round draft pick to the Cleveland Cavaliers in exchange for Kyrie Irving.

==== 2017–2019: Kyrie Irving saga ====
By the end of the off-season, only four Celtics' players remained from the 2016–17 team, with Marcus Smart being the longest-tenured Celtic from the 2014 NBA draft. On the team's opening night game in the first quarter against the Cavaliers, Hayward suffered a fractured tibia and dislocated ankle in his left leg, causing him to be ruled out for the rest of the regular season. Despite the loss, the Celtics went on a 16-game winning streak, which also went down as the fourth-longest winning streak in the teams' history. The Celtics finished the year with a 55–27 record, good enough for second place in the Eastern Conference. In the playoffs, they defeated the Milwaukee Bucks in the first round in seven games, and continued the feat in the conference semifinals by defeating the Philadelphia 76ers in five games before losing to the Cleveland Cavaliers in seven games in the conference finals.

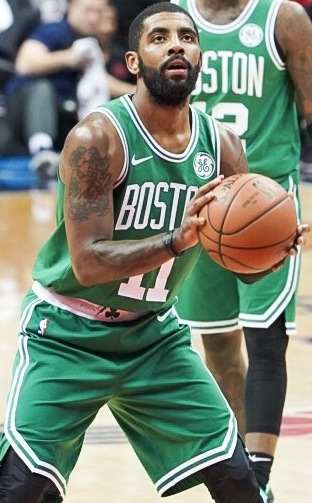
Kyrie Irving played for Boston for two seasons making two all star appearances.

The Celtics finished the 2018–19 season with a 49–33 record. Analysts started questioning the team's performance and chances for the championship when the Celtics had a 10–10 record after the first 20 games on November 24, 2018. The Celtics then won the next eight games improving their record to 18–10. During the eight-game win streak, the Celtics defeated the Cleveland Cavaliers 128–95, the New York Knicks 128–100, and also defeated the Chicago Bulls by 56 points (133–77), setting a record for the largest margin in a victory in franchise history, while also tying the record for largest victory margin by an away team. The Celtics finished the regular season in fourth place in the Eastern Conference. During an April 7 game, Marcus Smart injured his hip and was ruled out for the rest of the regular season and the first round of the playoffs. In the 2019 playoffs, the Celtics swept the Indiana Pacers in the first round, and then lost to the Milwaukee Bucks in five games.

The Celtics held four picks in the 2019 NBA draft. Following a series of transactions, the team landed Romeo Langford with the 14th pick and also added Grant Williams, Carsen Edwards, and Tremont Waters (2020 G-league Rookie of the year). During the 2019 off-season, Irving and Horford signed with the Brooklyn Nets and Philadelphia 76ers, respectively. Irving left, despite promising to stay in Boston. On June 30, 2019, the Celtics and point guard Kemba Walker agreed to a four-year maximum contract worth $141 million. On July 6, 2019, the Celtics officially acquired Walker in a sign and trade with the Charlotte Hornets; the Celtics sent guard Terry Rozier and a protected 2020 second-round draft pick to Charlotte in exchange for Walker and a 2020 second-round draft pick. On July 1, 2019, the Celtics agreed to a two-year contract with center Enes Kanter.

==== 2019–2021: Rise of "the Jays" ====
Following the suspension of the 2019–20 NBA season, the Celtics were one of the 22 teams invited to the NBA Bubble to participate in the final eight games of the regular season. In the 2020 playoffs, the Celtics swept the Philadelphia 76ers in the first round, beat the Toronto Raptors in a seven-game series, and fell to the Miami Heat in the conference finals in six games. Boston struggled with injuries in the 2020–21 season, with Walker, Tatum and Brown all missing games at different points in the season due to injury and COVID-19. Boston could not automatically qualify for the playoffs and were sent to the play-in tournament, where they defeated the Washington Wizards 119–100. In the playoffs, they lost to the Brooklyn Nets in five games.

On June 2, 2021, the Celtics named head coach Brad Stevens as president of basketball operations replacing Danny Ainge after he announced his retirement. On June 18, Stevens made his first transaction in his new position trading away Kemba Walker, the 16th pick in the 2021 NBA draft, and a 2025 second-round pick in exchange for former Celtic Horford, Moses Brown, and a 2023 second-round pick. On June 23, 2021, it was reported that Stevens had made the decision to hire Ime Udoka as his own replacement as head coach of the Celtics.

==== 2021–2024: Eastern Conference championship years ====
After a lackluster start to the 2021–22 season, the Celtics rebounded and finished with a 51–31 record to qualify for the 2022 NBA playoffs as the second seed in the Eastern Conference. Tatum made his third All-Star appearance off the bench at the 2022 NBA All-Star Game in Cleveland. The Celtics swept the Brooklyn Nets in the first round of the postseason. They next faced the Milwaukee Bucks in the conference semifinals and the Miami Heat in the conference finals, defeating both teams in seven-game series, earning the Celtics their first Finals appearance since 2010. The Celtics took a 2–1 series lead, but lost the next three games to lose to the Golden State Warriors 4–2. In September, the Celtics suspended Udoka for the whole 2022–23 season for engaging in an improper intimate relationship with a female staffer. Assistant coach Joe Mazzulla replaced Udoka as the interim head coach.

On February 16, 2023, Mazzulla was named the team's permanent head coach after leading the Celtics to a league-best 42–17 record at the NBA All-Star break. After overcoming a 3–2 deficit against the Philadelphia 76ers to advance to the conference finals, the Celtics fell behind 3–0 in a rematch against the Heat. They battled their way back to game 7 thanks to a Derrick White buzzer-beater in game 6, but the Heat ultimately prevented the first 3–0 comeback in NBA history with a decisive win in Boston, due to an injury early in the game to Jayson Tatum. During the 2023 off-season, the Celtics acquired Kristaps Porziņģis from the Wizards. In the trade, they sent Marcus Smart to the Memphis Grizzlies in a three-team deal, and also traded Grant Williams to the Dallas Mavericks.

Jayson Tatum holding the Larry O'Brien Championship Trophy after the 2024 NBA Finals

On October 1, 2023, the Celtics acquired Jrue Holiday in exchange for Malcolm Brogdon, Robert Williams III and two draft picks. On February 7, 2024, before the trade deadline, the Celtics acquired Xavier Tillman from the Grizzlies. The Celtics finished the 2023–24 regular season with the best record in the NBA, securing a 64–18 record. After the regular season's close, the Celtics entered the 2024 NBA playoffs, defeating the Miami Heat in the first round, moving on to defeat the Cleveland Cavaliers in the conference semifinals, and moving on again to defeat the Indiana Pacers in the conference finals. The Celtics' victory in the Eastern Conference Finals on May 27, 2024, was accompanied by the announcement that Jaylen Brown had been selected as the Eastern Conference finals MVP, and Brown was presented with the Larry Bird trophy, the first of his career. The Celtics would go on to defeat the Dallas Mavericks in five games to win the NBA Finals, their record-setting 18th championship and breaking the tie with the Lakers (who currently have 17).

==== 2024–2026: Latter years ====
During the 2024–25 season, the Celtics clinched another division title. They defeated the Orlando Magic in five games in the first round and then lost to the New York Knicks in the conference semifinals of the 2025 playoffs.

In the 2026 playoffs, the Celtics lost to the Philadelphia 76ers in the first round after blowing a 3–1 series lead. In the 2026 off-season, the Celtics traded Jaylen Brown to the 76ers in exchange for Paul George, two first-round picks and two second-round picks, ending "the Jays" era.

== Rivalries ==
=== Los Angeles Lakers ===
The rivalry between the Boston Celtics and Los Angeles Lakers involves the two most storied franchises in NBA history. It has been called the NBA's best rivalry. The two teams have met a record twelve times in the NBA Finals, starting with their first Finals meeting in 1959. They would go on to dominate the league in the 1960s and the 1980s, facing each other six times in the 1960s, three times in the 1980s, in 2008, and in 2010.

The Celtics have won the first eight finals meetings, while the Lakers won three of last four.

The rivalry had been less intense since the retirements of Magic Johnson and Larry Bird in the early 1990s, but in 2008 it was renewed as the Celtics and Lakers met in the Finals for the first time since 1987, with the Celtics winning the series in six games. They faced off once again in the 2010 NBA Finals which the Lakers won in seven games. The two teams are first and second for the highest number of championships, with the Celtics leading the Lakers, 18 titles to 17; together, their 35 championships account for almost half of the 78 championships in NBA history. In total, the Celtics lead the rivalry with 212 wins, to the Lakers 166. The Celtics are the only team in the NBA with a winning record against the Lakers.

=== Atlanta Hawks ===
The Celtics–Hawks rivalry is a rivalry in the Eastern Conference of the National Basketball Association that has lasted for over five decades, although the two teams have played each other since the 1949–50 season, when the then-Tri-Cities Blackhawks joined the NBA as part of the National Basketball League and the Basketball Association of America merger. However, the Blackhawks could not field a truly competitive team until they moved to St. Louis as the St. Louis Hawks after a four-year stopover at Milwaukee. The two teams have faced each other eleven times in the NBA Playoffs, four times in the NBA Finals, with the Celtics winning ten of twelve series against the Hawks, including three out of four NBA Finals. While the Hawks have only defeated the Celtics twice out of eleven series in the NBA Playoffs, they still often managed to make their series with the Celtics memorable. The rivalry intensified in 2016 with Hawks All-Star Center Al Horford spurning the team and joining the Celtics.

=== Brooklyn Nets ===
The Boston Celtics were once rivals of the New Jersey Nets during the early 2000s due to their respective locations and their burgeoning stars. The Nets were led by Jason Kidd and Kenyon Martin, while the Celtics were experiencing newfound success behind Paul Pierce and Antoine Walker. The rivalry began to heat up in the 2002 Eastern Conference finals, which was preceded by trash-talking from the Celtics who claimed Martin was a "fake" tough guy. Things progressed as the series started, and on-court tensions seemed to spill into the stands. Celtics' fans berated Kidd and his family with chants of "Wife Beater!" in response to Kidd's 2001 domestic abuse charge. When asked about the fan barbs being traded, Kenyon Martin stated, "Our fans hate them, their fans hate us." Bill Walton said at the time that Nets-Celtics was the "beginning of the next great NBA rivalry" during the conference finals in 2002 with the Nets advancing to the NBA Finals, though New Jersey would go on to sweep Boston in the 2003 playoffs. In 2012, the year the Nets returned to New York in the borough of Brooklyn, there were indications that the rivalry might be rekindled when an altercation occurred on the court on November 28, resulting in the ejection of Rajon Rondo, Gerald Wallace, and Kris Humphries. Rondo was suspended for two games in the aftermath, while Wallace and Kevin Garnett were fined. The story was revisited on December 25, when Wallace grabbed Garnett's shorts and the two had to be broken up by referees and players alike. However, the rivalry between the Nets and the Celtics appeared significantly cooled off by the June 2013 blockbuster trade that dealt Celtics stars Garnett and Paul Pierce to the Nets in exchange for Wallace, Humphries, and others. This move was billed as a merger of the two Atlantic Division teams.

=== Detroit Pistons ===
The rivalry between the Celtics and the Detroit Pistons peaked in the 1980s, featuring players such as Larry Bird, Kevin McHale, Robert Parish, Isiah Thomas, Bill Laimbeer, Dennis Rodman, and Joe Dumars. These teams met in the NBA playoffs five times in 7 seasons from 1985 to 1991, with the Celtics winning in 1985 and 1987, and the Pistons coming out on top en route to back-to-back Finals appearances in 1988 and their championship seasons of 1989 and 1990. Led by Paul Pierce, Kevin Garnett and Ray Allen in the 2008 Eastern Conference Finals the Celtics defeated the Pistons in six games to advance to the NBA Finals where they went on to beat the Lakers also in six games.

=== New York Knicks ===
The rivalry between the Celtics and the New York Knicks stems from the location of the teams, both of which are in the NBA's Atlantic division. It is one of many rivalries between Boston and New York teams, most notably the Boston Red Sox and New York Yankees in Major League Baseball. Boston and New York are also the only two original NBA franchises that have remained in the same city for the duration of their existence. The teams have played 512 games against each other during the regular season, with the Celtics winning 276 times. The two teams have also faced each other 61 times during the playoffs, with the Celtics winning 34 times.

=== Philadelphia 76ers ===
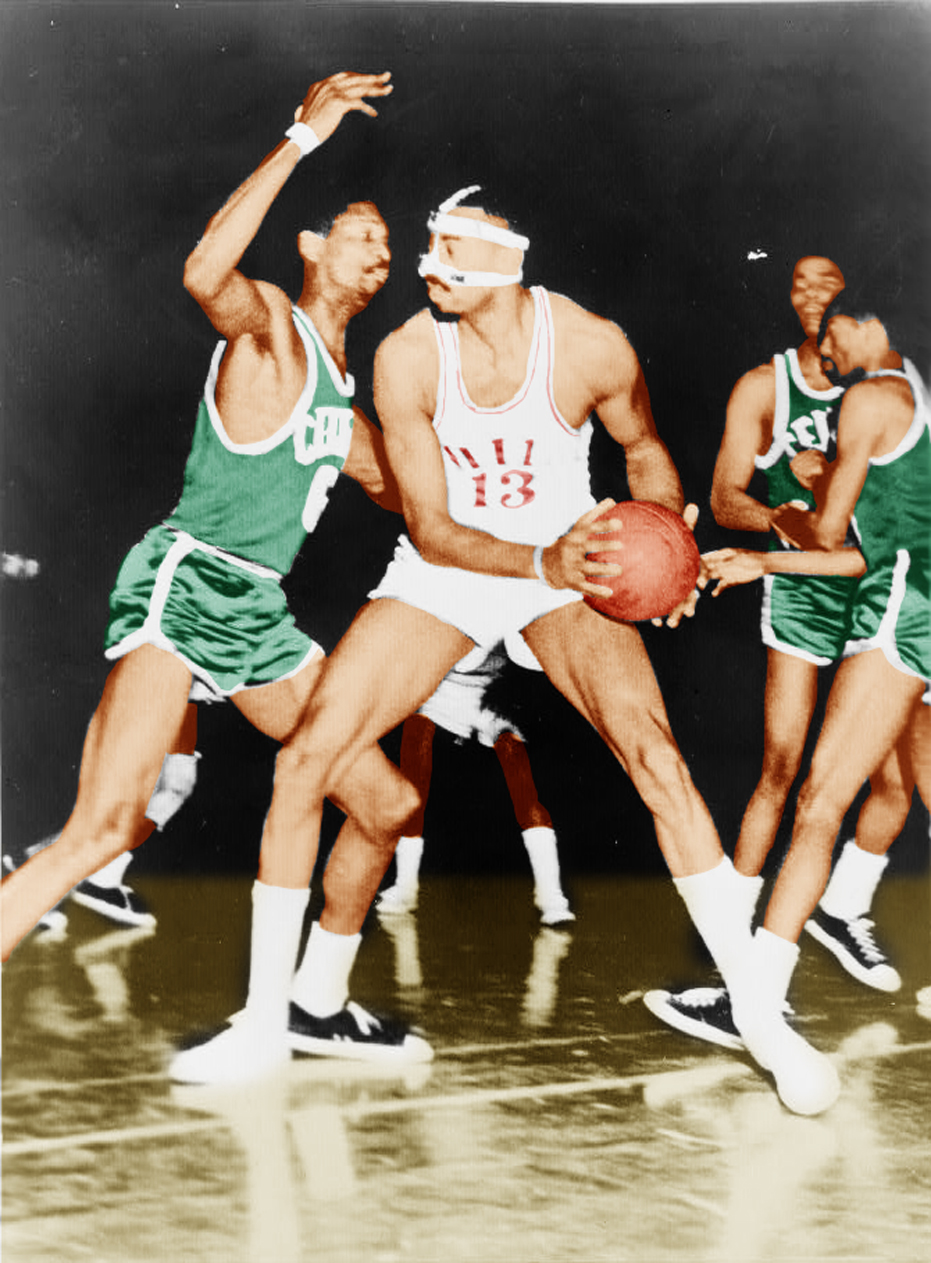
Wilt Chamberlain of the Philadelphia 76ers being defended by Celtics' center Bill Russell in 1966

The Celtics and the Philadelphia 76ers are the two teams who have the most meetings in the NBA playoffs, playing each other in 22 series, of which the Celtics have won 15. The 76ers are considered the Celtics' biggest rival in the Eastern Conference. The rivalry reached its peak when players Bill Russell and Wilt Chamberlain of the 76ers played each other from 1965 to 1968. Their play would result in the Celtics not winning every NBA Finals series in the 1960s when the 76ers won in 1967.

=== Washington Wizards ===
One of the most recent and unexpected rivalries that has been created between the Celtics is with the Washington Wizards. Although both teams had engaged in a fight in 1984, the rivalry intensified during the 2015–16 season in a January regular season game after Jae Crowder was given a technical foul. Crowder then began to exchange words with then Wizards coach Randy Wittman. It began to escalate that off-season when the Celtics were trying to sign Al Horford. It was publicly reported that Jae Crowder emphasized that the Celtics beat the Wizards in all of their meetings that season and should sign with them rather than Washington. In their first meeting of the 2016–17 season, Wall hit Marcus Smart in the back-court when they were up by 20 late in the fourth quarter. Wall was hit with a Flagrant 2 foul and was promptly ejected. Smart immediately got back up and began to scuffle with Wall. Their words continued even after being separated with Wall telling Smart to meet him out back after the game. No incident was reported between the two following the game. In their next meeting, the Celtics won 117–108. However, after the game Wall and Crowder exchanged words in front of the Wizards bench. Crowder ended up trying to jab his finger at Wall's nose and Wall tried to fight back with a slap. Teammates and coaches from both sides had to step in and separate the two teams but the players continued to yell while entering their respective locker rooms. Police officers had to be on guard between the two locker rooms to ensure no further confrontation. Otto Porter is quoted as calling the Celtics as dirty. Isaiah Thomas replied "If playing hard is dirty, then I guess we are a dirty team."

In their next game in January, the Wizards wore all black to enter the game. The notion was that it is similar to the attire of a funeral. Their decision worked as they defeated the Celtics 123–108. The two teams would go on to meet in the conference semifinals in the 2017 playoffs. In game 1, Markieff Morris landed on Horford's ankle after shooting a jumpshot. Morris sprained his ankle and had to miss the rest of the game which was a 123–111 loss. Morris believed that Horford did this intentionally. In game 2, Morris retaliated by grabbing Horford by the waist and pushed him into the seats. In game 3, Kelly Olynyk set a hard screen on Kelly Oubre. Olynyk's shoulder hit Oubre in the chin causing him to drop to the floor. Oubre angrily rose and pushed Olynyk down onto the floor. Oubre was then assessed a flagrant 2 foul and was ejected while also being suspended for game 4. No significant altercations erupted in the rest of the seven-game series in which the Celtics would go on to win. The rivalry has since dissipated as the Celtics have retooled their roster but their match-ups are still seen as significant as they played on Christmas in 2017.

=== Miami Heat ===
The Boston Celtics and the Miami Heat developed an intense rivalry during the 2010s. The two teams were highlighted by their star trios in Boston's Ray Allen, Kevin Garnett and Paul Pierce whereas Miami had LeBron James, Dwyane Wade and Chris Bosh. They first met in the 2010 NBA playoffs where Boston won the series in five games. They would then meet the following year where Miami would end up winning in five games. The teams would meet for the third straight year in the 2012 Eastern Conference finals. Despite Boston holding a 3–2 lead, Miami would win the next two games to advance to the NBA Finals where they defeated the Oklahoma City Thunder. In the 2020 NBA Bubble, the Miami Heat and Boston Celtics met in the 2020 conference finals where Miami won in six games and advanced to the NBA Finals where they were prevented Boston from meeting their longtime rival Los Angeles Lakers. Miami lost swiftly in six games to the Los Angeles Lakers. They would meet in the 2022 conference finals where Boston finally beat the Miami Heat in seven games. It was their first win against Miami since 2010. In the following year, the two met in the 2023 conference finals. Despite Miami taking a commanding a 3–0 lead, Boston won the next three games to send the series to seven games. However, Miami won to avoid earning the distinction of blowing a 3–0 lead while also preventing Boston from meeting the Nuggets in the Finals. They then met in the 2024 first round where Boston beat Miami in five games.

== Season-by-season record ==
List of the last five seasons completed by the Celtics. For the full season-by-season history, see List of Boston Celtics seasons.

Note: GP = Games played, W = Wins, L = Losses, W–L% = Winning percentage

Season	GP	W	L	W–L%	Finish	Playoffs
2021–22	82	51	31	.622	1st, Atlantic	Lost in NBA Finals, 2–4 (Warriors)
2022–23	82	57	25	.695	1st, Atlantic	Lost in conference finals, 3–4 (Heat)
2023–24	82	64	18	.780	1st, Atlantic	NBA champions, 4–1 (Mavericks)
2024–25	82	61	21	.744	1st, Atlantic	Lost in conference semifinals, 2–4 (Knicks)
2025–26	82	56	26	.683	1st, Atlantic	Lost in first round, 3–4 (76ers)

== Records, retired numbers, and awards ==
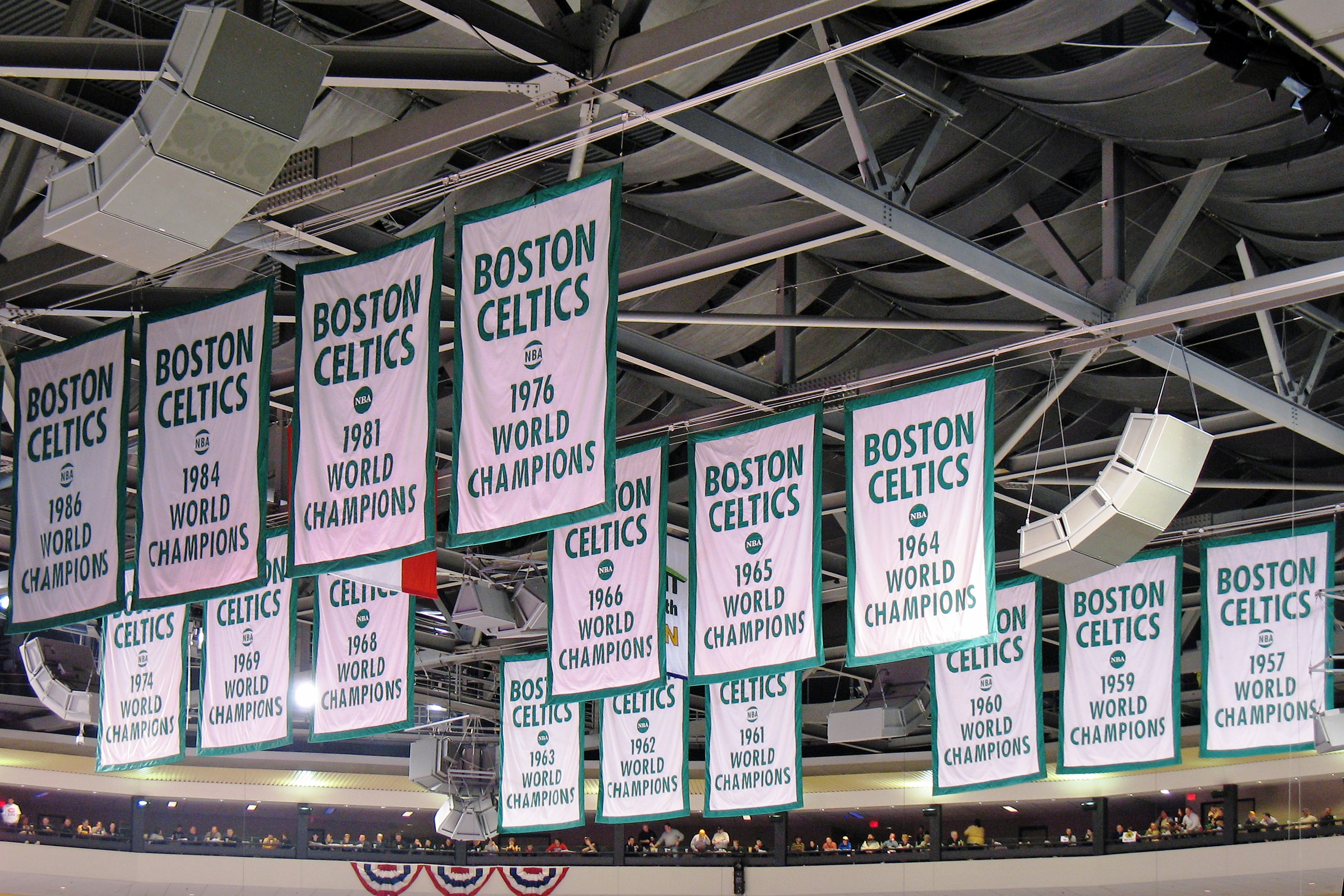
Boston Celtics NBA Championship banners

The Celtics have won an NBA-record 18 championships. 49 members of the Naismith Memorial Basketball Hall of Fame are connected to the Celtics, and the franchise has retired 23 jersey numbers, more than any other American sports team. As of April 2026, the Celtics have won more NBA regular season games than any other team.

=== Hall of Fame ===
38 men were inducted in the Naismith Memorial Basketball Hall of Fame as players, 7 – as coaches, 6 – as contributors.

Boston Celtics Hall of Famers
Players
No.	Name	Position	Tenure	Inducted	No.	Name	Position	Tenure	Inducted
22	Ed Macauley	F/C	1950–1956	1960	17	Andy Phillip	G	1956–1958	1961
14	Bob Cousy	G	1950–1963	1971	6	Bill Russell ^{3}	C	1956–1969	1975
21	Bill Sharman	G	1951–1961	1976	23	Frank Ramsey	G/F	1954–1964	1982
24	Sam Jones	G/F	1957–1969	1984	17	John Havlicek	G/F	1962–1978	1984
15; 20	Tom Heinsohn ^{1}	F	1956–1965	1986	20	Bob Houbregs	C/F	1954	1987
44	Pete Maravich	G	1980	1987	4; 34	Clyde Lovellette	C	1962–1964	1988
25; 27	K. C. Jones	G	1958–1967	1989	44	Dave Bing	G	1977–1978	1990
18	Dave Cowens	F/C	1970–1980	1991	7	Nate Archibald	G	1978–1983	1991
5	Bill Walton	C	1985–1988	1993	18	Bailey Howell	F	1966–1970	1997
19	Arnie Risen	C	1955–1958	1998	33	Larry Bird ^{2}	F	1979–1992	1998
32	Kevin McHale	F	1980–1993	1999	11	Bob McAdoo	C/F	1979	2000
00	Robert Parish	C	1980–1994	2003	12	Dominique Wilkins	F	1994–1995	2006
3	Dennis Johnson	G	1983–1990	2010	53	Artis Gilmore	C	1988	2011
20	Gary Payton	G	2004–2005	2013	10	Jo Jo White	G	1969–1979	2015
36	Shaquille O'Neal	C	2010–2011	2016	11	Charlie Scott	G	1975–1977	2018
40	Dino Rađa	F/C	1994–1997	2018	20	Ray Allen	G	2007–2012	2018
11	Chuck Cooper	F	1950–1954	2019	4	Carl Braun	G	1961–1962	2019
44	Paul Westphal	G	1972–1975	2019	5	Kevin Garnett	F	2007–2013	2020
34	Paul Pierce	F	1998–2013	2021	4	Chauncey Billups	G	1997–1998	2024
Coaches
Name		Position	Tenure	Inducted	Name		Position	Tenure	Inducted
Doggie Julian		Head coach	1948–1950	1968	2	Red Auerbach	Head coach	1950–1966	1969
Rick Pitino		Head coach	1997–2001	2013	Tom Heinsohn ^{1}		Head coach	1969–1978	2015
Bill Fitch		Head coach	1979–1983	2019	Bill Russell ^{3}		Head coach	1966–1969	2021
Doc Rivers		Head coach	2004–2013	2026					
Contributors
Name		Position	Tenure	Inducted	Name		Position	Tenure	Inducted
1	Walter A. Brown	Owner	1945–1964	1965	Bill Mokray		Executive	1946–1969	1965
28	Wayne Embry	C	1966–1968	1999	Dave Gavitt		Executive	1990–1994	2006
16	Satch Sanders ^{4}	F	1960–1973	2011	17	Don Barksdale	F	1953–1955	2012

Additionally, Johnny Most and Mike Gorman were honored with the Hall of Fame's Curt Gowdy Media Award. Most was awarded in 1993 for his 37-year career as the Celtics radio announcer, while Gorman was awarded in 2021 for his 40-year career as the Celtics television announcer.

Notes:

- ^{1} In total, Heinsohn was inducted into the Hall of Fame twice – as player and as coach.
- ^{2} In total, Bird was inducted into the Hall of Fame twice – as player and as a member of the 1992 Olympic team.
- ^{3} In total, Russell was inducted into the Hall of Fame twice – as player and as coach.
- ^{4} Sanders also coached the team in 1978.

=== FIBA Hall of Fame ===
FIBA, the body which governs international basketball, has selected two players associated with the Celtics to the FIBA Hall of Fame for contributions to international basketball.

Boston Celtics FIBA Hall of Famers
Players
No.	Name	Position	Tenure	Inducted
6	Bill Russell	C	1956–1969	2007
36	Shaquille O'Neal	C	2010–2011	2017

== Home arenas ==
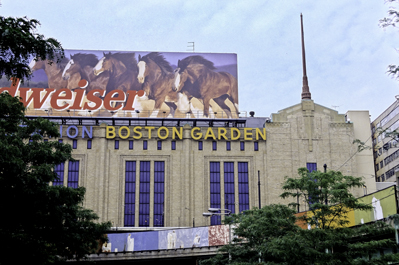
Boston Garden in 1994

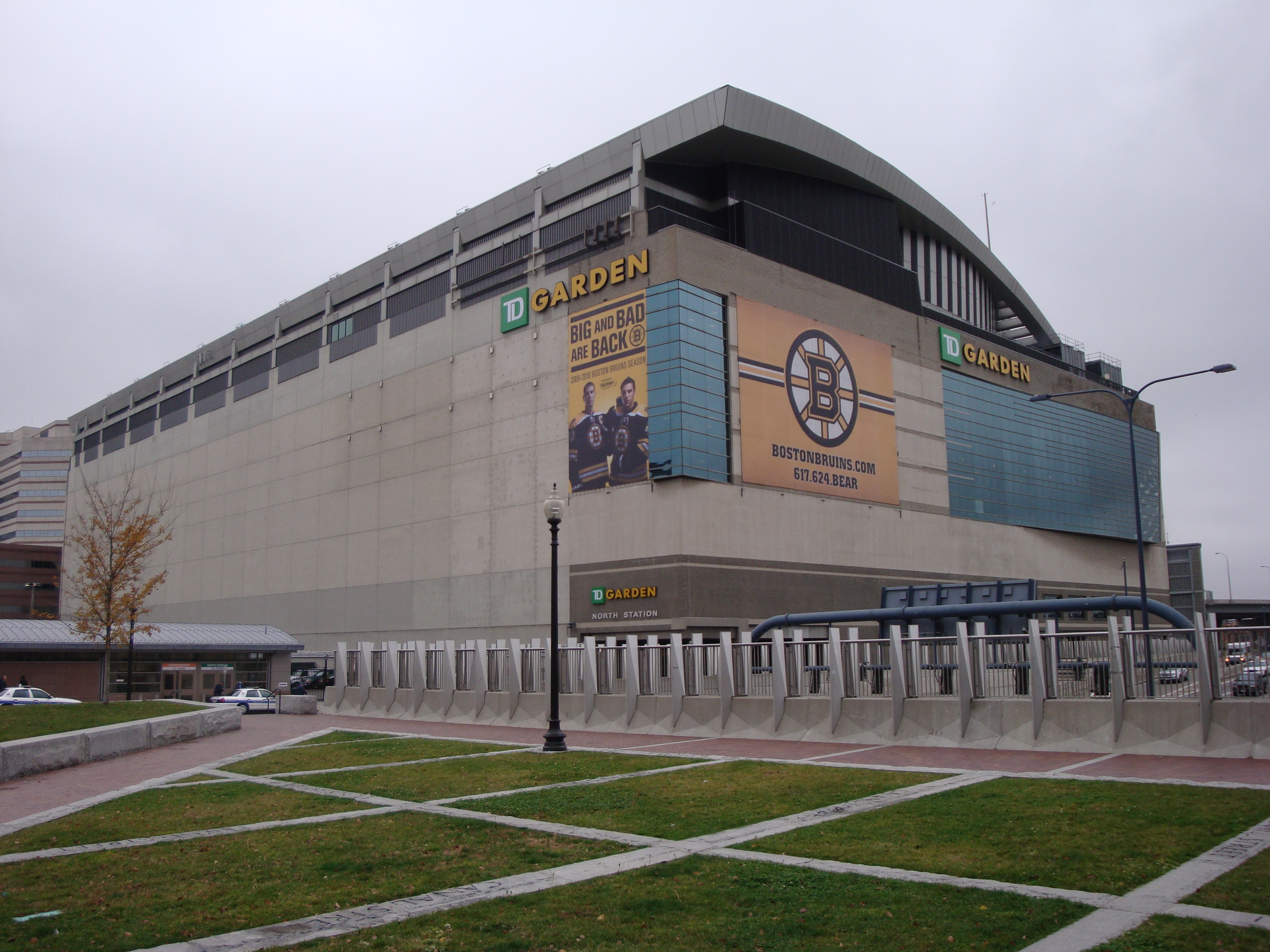
TD Garden in 2009

Arena	Location	Duration
Boston Arena	Boston, Massachusetts	1946–1955
Boston Garden	Boston, Massachusetts	1946–1995
TD Garden	Boston, Massachusetts	1995–present

== Personnel ==
=== Current roster ===
Boston Celtics roster
Players

Pos.	No.	Player	Height	Weight	DOB	From
G	99	Devin Carter (TW)	6 ft 2 in (1.88 m)	199 lb (90 kg)	2002-03-18	Providence
F	12	Chris Cenac Jr. (GL)	6 ft 11 in (2.11 m)	240 lb (109 kg)	2007-02-01	Houston
G	45	Mike Conley	6 ft 0 in (1.83 m)	182 lb (83 kg)	1987-10-11	Ohio State
C	52	Luka Garza	6 ft 10 in (2.08 m)	252 lb (114 kg)	1998-12-27	Iowa
F	13	Paul George	6 ft 8 in (2.03 m)	230 lb (104 kg)	1990-05-02	Fresno State
G	28	Hugo González	6 ft 6 in (1.98 m)	200 lb (91 kg)	2006-02-04	Spain
G/F	8	Ron Harper Jr.	6 ft 5 in (1.96 m)	231 lb (105 kg)	2000-04-12	Rutgers
F	30	Sam Hauser	6 ft 7 in (2.01 m)	217 lb (98 kg)	1997-12-08	Virginia
F	20	Dillon Mitchell (TW)	6 ft 6 in (1.98 m)	200 lb (91 kg)	2003-10-03	St. John's
G	11	Payton Pritchard	6 ft 1 in (1.85 m)	212 lb (96 kg)	1998-01-28	Oregon
C	88	Neemias Queta	7 ft 0 in (2.13 m)	270 lb (122 kg)	1999-07-13	Utah State
F/C	4	Mitchell Robinson	7 ft 0 in (2.13 m)	245 lb (111 kg)	1998-04-01	Chalmette HS (LA)
G	55	Baylor Scheierman	6 ft 6 in (1.98 m)	213 lb (97 kg)	2000-09-26	Creighton
G/F	0	Jayson Tatum	6 ft 8 in (2.03 m)	229 lb (104 kg)	1998-03-03	Duke
G	27	Jordan Walsh	6 ft 6 in (1.98 m)	210 lb (95 kg)	2004-03-03	Arkansas
G	9	Derrick White	6 ft 4 in (1.93 m)	200 lb (91 kg)	1994-07-02	Colorado
F/C	77	Amari Williams (TW)	6 ft 11 in (2.11 m)	269 lb (122 kg)	2002-01-28	Kentucky

Coaches
**Head coach**
- Joe Mazzulla
**Assistant(s)**
- Sam Cassell
- Tony Dobbins
- D. J. MacLeay
- Amile Jefferson
- Matt Reynolds
- Ross McMains
- Tyler Lashbrook
- Craig Luschenat

**Legend**
- **(DP)** Unsigned draft pick
- **(FA)** Free agent
- **(S)** Suspended
- **(GL)** On assignment to G League affiliate
- **(TW)** Two-way affiliate player
- Injured

Roster
Updated: October 20, 2026

=== Retained draft rights ===
The Celtics hold the draft rights to the following unsigned draft picks who have been playing outside the NBA. A drafted player is ostensibly either an international draftee or a college draftee who is not signed by the team that drafted him, is allowed to sign with any non-NBA teams. In this case, the team retains the player's draft rights in the NBA until one year after the player's contract with the non-NBA team ends. This list includes draft rights that were acquired from trades with other teams.

Draft	Round	Pick	Player	Pos.	Nationality	Current team	Note(s)	Ref
2021	2	45	Juhann Begarin	G	France	AS Monaco (Monaco)		
2020	2	47	Yam Madar	G	Israel	Hapoel Tel Aviv (Israel)		

=== Captains ===
All-time team captains
Captain	Tenure
Bob Cousy	1950–1963
Frank Ramsey & Bill Russell	1963–1964
Bill Russell	1964–1966
John Havlicek	January 16, 1967–1978
Jo Jo White & Dave Cowens	October 17, 1978–November 14, 1978
Jo Jo White	November 14, 1978 – January 30, 1979
Dave Cowens & Chris Ford	January 31, 1979–1979
Dave Cowens	1979 – October 1, 1980
Larry Bird	1983–1992
Reggie Lewis	1992–1993
Robert Parish	1993–1994
Dominique Wilkins & Dee Brown	1994–1995
Dee Brown	1995–1996
Rick Fox	1996–1997
Dee Brown & Antoine Walker	October 8, 1997–December 2, 1997
Dee Brown, Antoine Walker, & Pervis Ellison	December 2, 1997–February 18, 1998
Antoine Walker and Pervis Ellison	February 18, 1998 – 1998
Antoine Walker	1998–1999
Antoine Walker & Dana Barros	1999–2000
Antoine Walker & Paul Pierce	2000–2003
Paul Pierce	2003–2013
Rajon Rondo	January 17, 2014 – December 19, 2014

=== Franchise leaders ===
Bold denotes still active with the team.

Italic denotes still active but not with the team.

Points scored (regular season) (as of the end of the 2025–26 season)

1. John Havlicek (26,395)
2. Paul Pierce (24,021)
3. Larry Bird (21,791)
4. Robert Parish (18,245)
5. Kevin McHale (17,335)
6. Bob Cousy (16,955)
7. Sam Jones (15,411)
8. Bill Russell (14,522)
9. **Jayson Tatum** (14,132)
10. Jaylen Brown (13,474)
11. Dave Cowens (13,192)
12. Jo Jo White (13,188)
13. Bill Sharman (12,287)
14. Tom Heinsohn (12,194)
15. Antoine Walker (11,386)
16. Don Nelson (9,968)
17. Satch Sanders (8,766)
18. Frank Ramsey (8,378)
19. Cedric Maxwell (8,311)
20. Reggie Lewis (7,902)
21. Ed Macauley (7,882)
22. Dennis Johnson (6,805)
23. Danny Ainge (6,257)
24. Kevin Garnett (6,233)
25. Marcus Smart (6,141)
26. Ray Allen (5,987)
27. Bailey Howell (5,812)
28. Rajon Rondo (5,783)
29. Don Chaney (5,689)
30. Dee Brown (5,512)
31. Larry Siegfried (5,420)
32. Al Horford (5,221)
33. K.C. Jones (5,011)
34. Avery Bradley (5,008)
35. **Derrick White** (4,925)
36. Kevin Gamble (4,895)
37. Rick Fox (4,759)
38. Tiny Archibald (4,550)
39. **Payton Pritchard** (4,498)
40. Isaiah Thomas (4,422)
41. Eric Williams (4,248)
42. Paul Silas (3,744)
43. Dino Radja (3,733)
44. Gerald Henderson (3,521)
45. Jeff Green (3,252)
46. Brandon Bass (3,216)
47. Chris Ford (3,194)
48. Jim Loscutoff (3,156)
49. Dana Barros (3,109)
50. Kyrie Irving (3,062)

Other statistics (regular season) (as of the end of the 2025–26 season)

Most minutes played
Player	Minutes
John Havlicek	46,471
Bill Russell	40,726
Paul Pierce	40,360
Robert Parish	34,977
Larry Bird	34,443
Bob Cousy	30,131
Kevin McHale	30,118
Dave Cowens	28,551
Jo Jo White	26,770
Sam Jones	24,285

Most rebounds
Player	Rebounds
Bill Russell	21,620
Robert Parish	11,051
Dave Cowens	10,170
Larry Bird	8,974
John Havlicek	8,007
Kevin McHale	7,122
Paul Pierce	6,651
Satch Sanders	5,798
Tom Heinsohn	5,749
Antoine Walker	4,782

Most assists
Player	Assists
Bob Cousy	6,945
John Havlicek	6,114
Larry Bird	5,695
Rajon Rondo	4,474
Paul Pierce	4,305
Bill Russell	4,100
Jo Jo White	3,686
Dennis Johnson	3,486
K. C. Jones	2,908
Dave Cowens	2,828

Most steals
Player	Steals
Paul Pierce	1,583
Larry Bird	1,556
Rajon Rondo	990
Marcus Smart	914
Robert Parish	873
Antoine Walker	828
Jaylen Brown	684
Dee Brown	675
Danny Ainge	671
**Jayson Tatum**	661

Most blocks
Player	Blocks
Robert Parish	1,703
Kevin McHale	1,690
Larry Bird	755
Paul Pierce	668
Kendrick Perkins	646
Al Horford	516
Dave Cowens	473
Reggie Lewis	417
Kevin Garnett	394
**Jayson Tatum**	387

Most three-pointers made
Player	3-pointers made
Paul Pierce	1,823
**Jayson Tatum**	1,593
Jaylen Brown	1,284
Antoine Walker	937
Marcus Smart	911
**Payton Pritchard**	873
**Derrick White**	853
Ray Allen	798
**Sam Hauser**	720
Al Horford	712

== Coaches ==
=== Head coaches ===
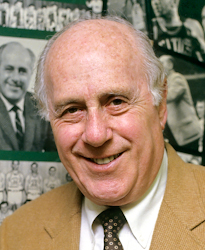
Red Auerbach coached the Boston Celtics to 9 NBA titles, with eight straight between 1959 and 1966.

There have been 18 head coaches in Celtics' history. Red Auerbach is the most successful franchise's head coach having won 9 NBA championships with the team. Celtics' legend Bill Russell took coaching duties from Auerbach and led them to 2 NBA championships while playing and coaching at the same time. The other two coaches that won 2 NBA titles with the team are Tom Heinsohn and K. C. Jones. Bill Fitch and Doc Rivers led the Celtics to 1 NBA championship apiece, as has current head coach Joe Mazzulla.

== Logos and uniforms ==
=== Logos ===
The Celtics' wordmark, used since the 1969–70 season

The Boston Celtics logo has a leprechaun spinning a basketball, named Lucky, originally depicted with a large basketball for a background. It was originally designed by Zang Auerbach, the brother of Celtics head coach Red Auerbach. Through the 1995–96 season, the logo's only colors were green, white and black. Then for the 1996–97 season, celebrating the club's 50th anniversary, the logo got a full-color treatment. Lucky's face and hands were both painted tan, while gold was included on the vest, bow tie and hat, as well as brown on the ball and shillelagh, and black on its pants and shoes.

The Celtics also have various alternative logos, with the most popular being a white shamrock with the letters "Celtics" above it, wrapped in a green circle, which has been used since the 1998–99 season. The alternate logo is based on logos used by the Celtics before they used the Zang Auerbach leprechaun. For much of its history, the shamrock was trimmed in gold, as seen in the old team warmup jackets. A new secondary logo, unveiled in 2014, had a variation of the leprechaun logo, in silhouette form.

=== Uniforms ===
==== Primary uniforms ====
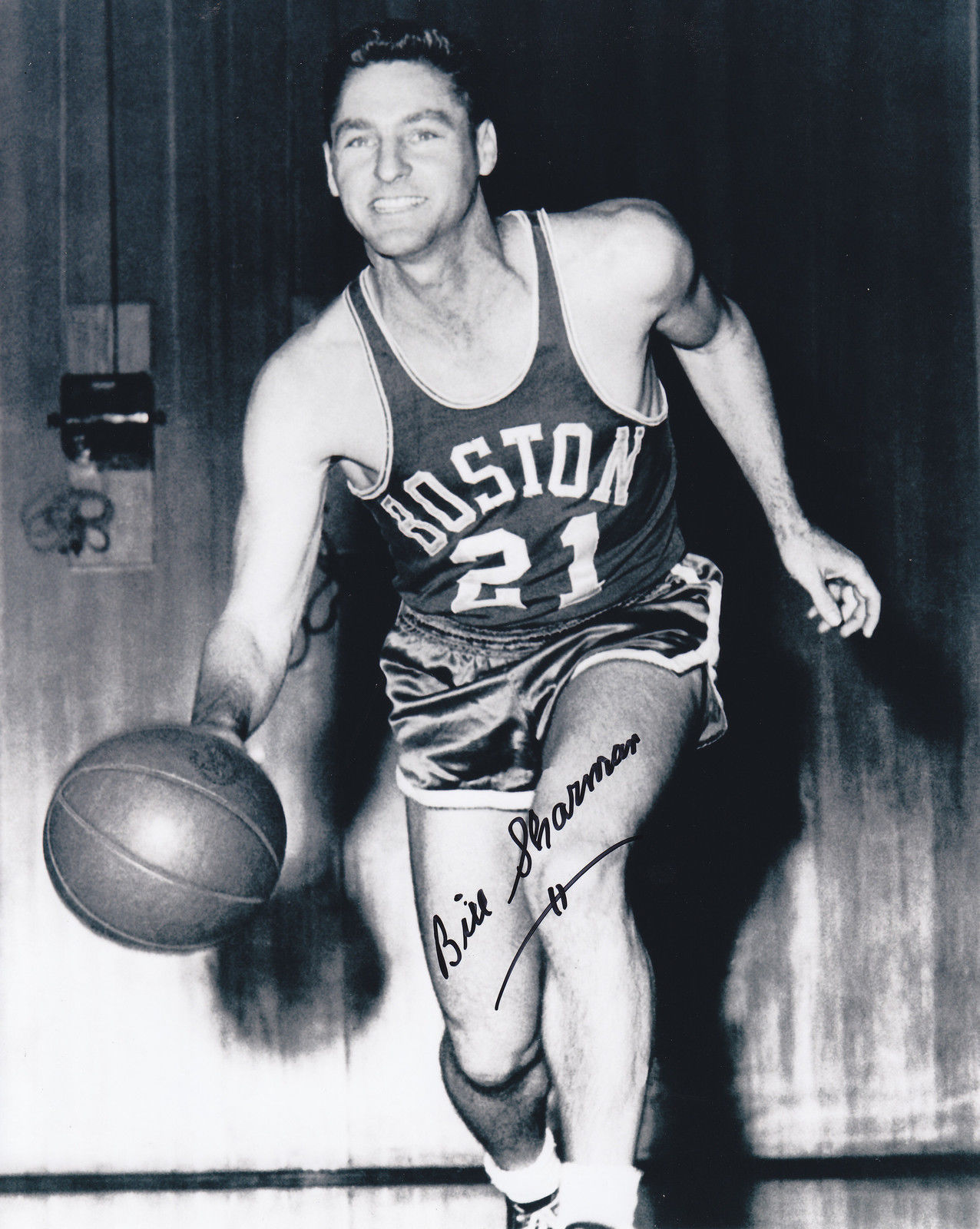
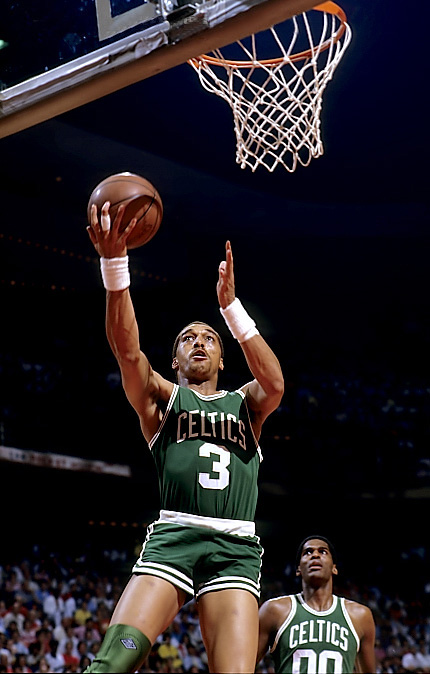
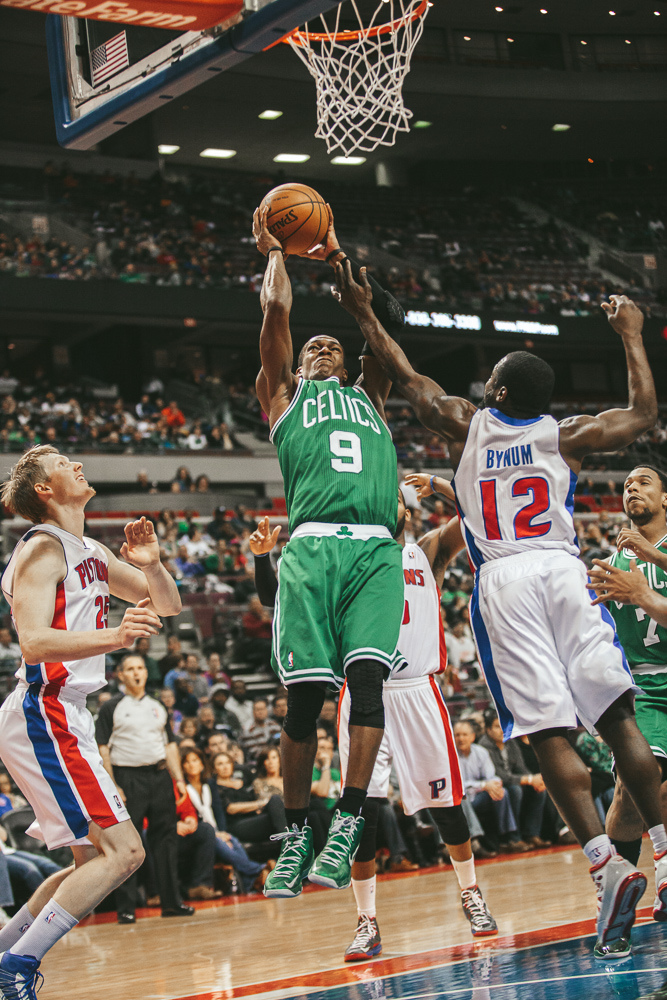
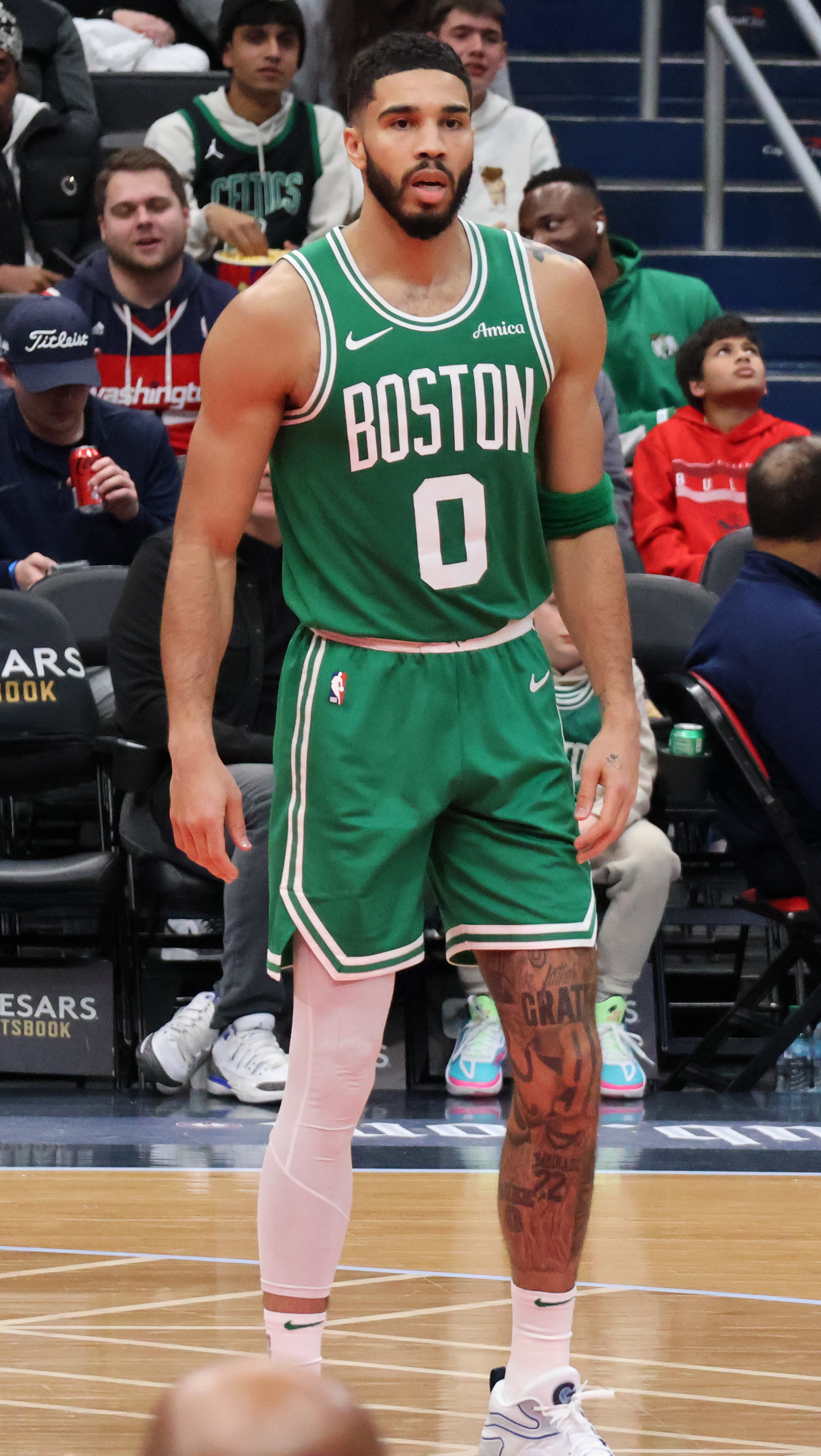
The Celtics uniforms, as worn by Bill Sharman, Dennis Johnson, Rajon Rondo and Jayson Tatum, have seen minimal changes since the 1950s.

For much of their history, the Celtics wore green uniforms on the road and white uniforms at home. The basic template of the current Celtics' uniforms was formalized in the team's early years, and along the way they made a few adjustments in the lettering and stripes.

Among the more notable changes in the uniforms were the switch from serifed to sans-serif block lettering in 1968, the addition of names in 1972, and the incorporation of the three-leaf shamrock logo in 1998. While the white uniforms remained largely intact, the green uniforms have featured either the city name (1950s–1965; 2014–present) or the team name (1965–2014).

When Nike became the NBA's uniform provider in 2017, they decided to eliminate the "home" and "away" uniform designations. Thus the white Celtics uniforms became known as the "Association" uniforms while the green uniforms became the "Icon" uniforms. Both sets are now used regardless of home and road games.

In January 2017, the Celtics signed a multi-year deal with General Electric where they became the "exclusive Data and Analytics partner" for the team. As part of the deal, GE agreed to pay the Celtics more than $7 million per year to have the uniforms with a GE logo prominently placed on the left shoulder of jerseys in green and white. This was the first time a corporate logo were placed on the game uniforms. Along with the GE logo, the Nike logo now emblazons the right shoulder of the Celtics' uniforms.

In November 2020, the Celtics signed a multi-year deal with Vistaprint who became the main jersey sponsor of the team. In July 2024, Amica Mutual Insurance signed on as the team's jersey sponsor.

==== Alternate uniforms ====
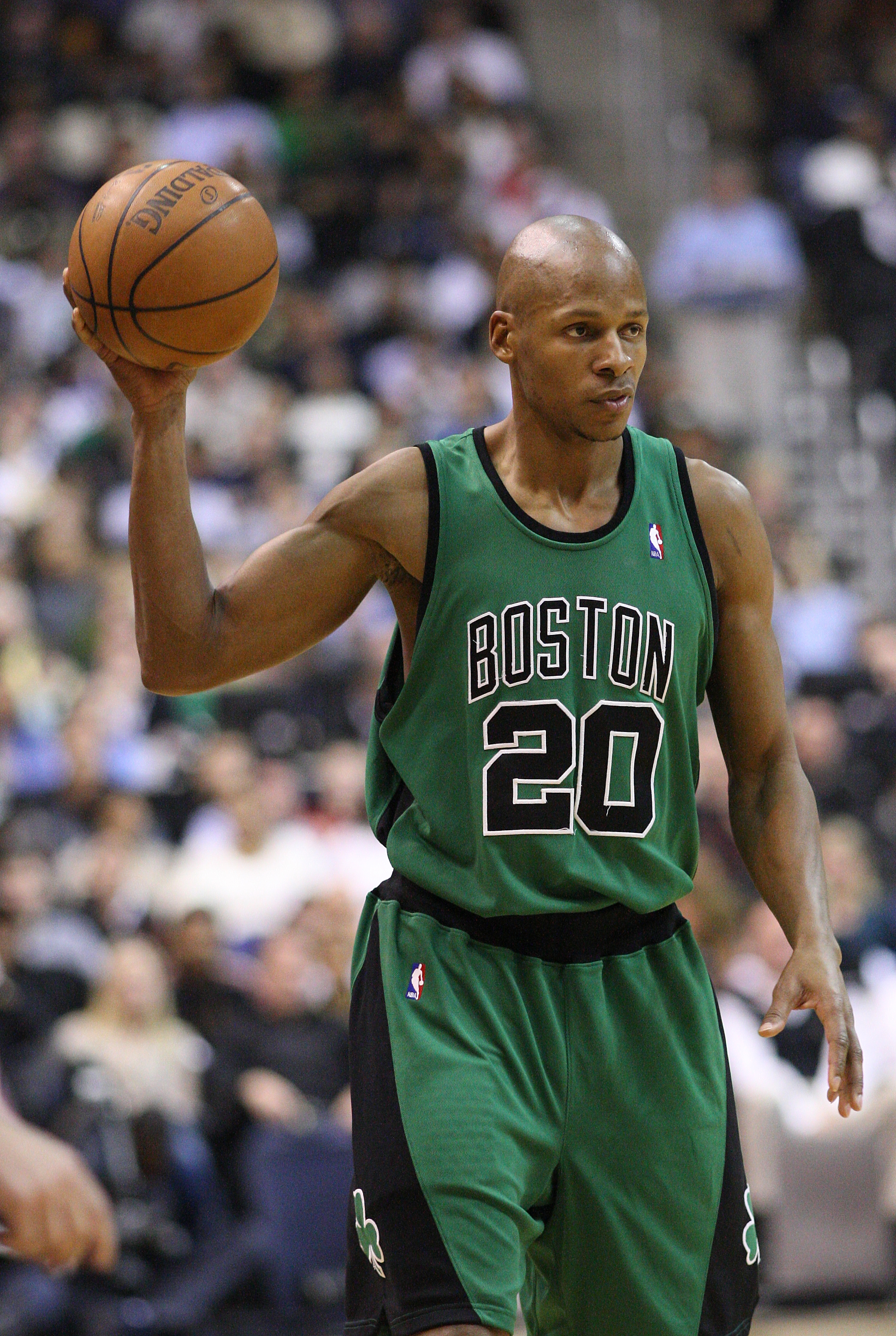
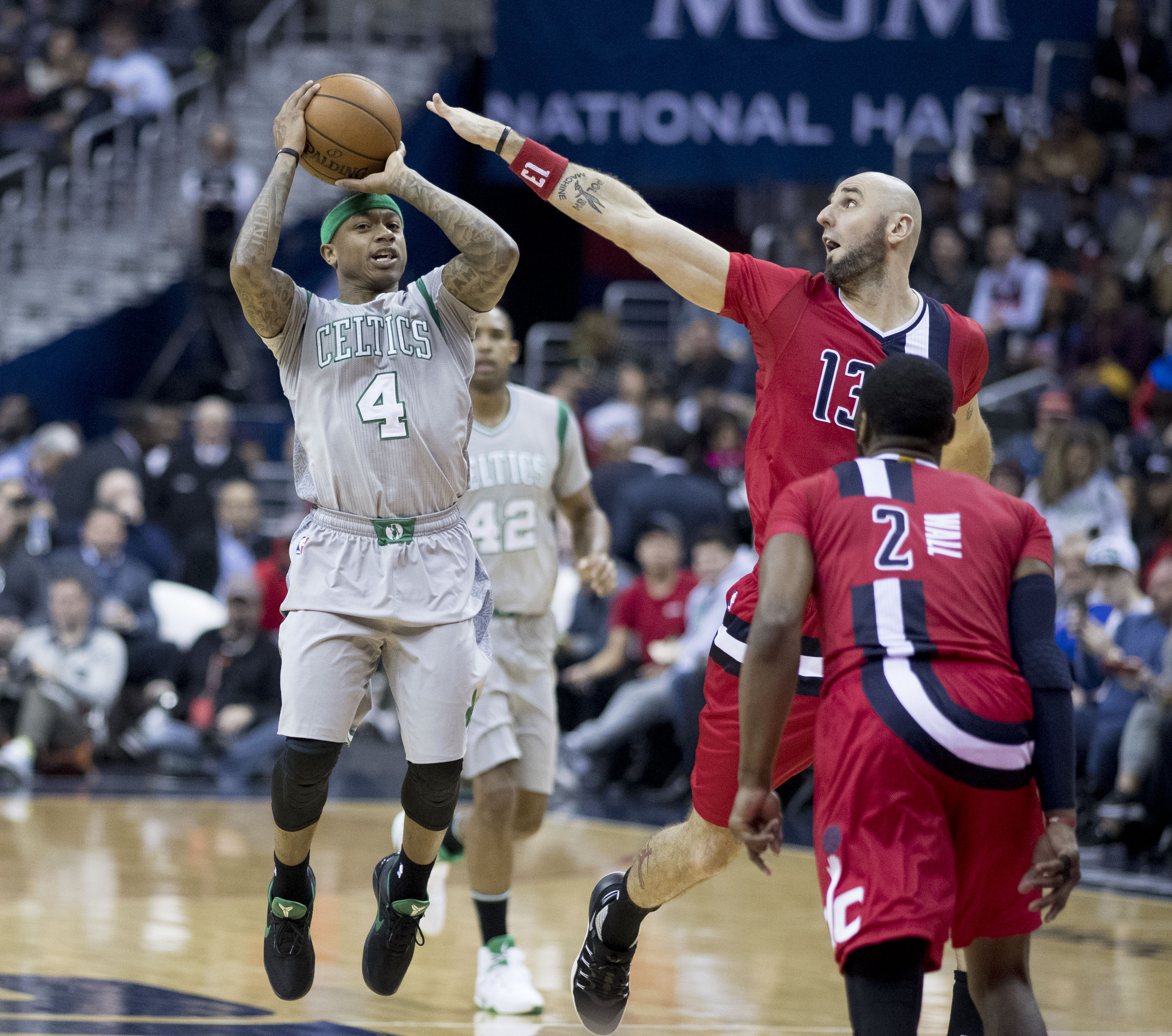
Ray Allen (left) wearing the alternate green uniform in 2008; Isaiah Thomas (right) wearing the alternate gray "Parquet Pride" uniform in 2017.

From 2005 to 2017, the Celtics wore alternate green uniforms with black lettering and trim featuring the word "Boston" on the front side. One noticeable difference in the alternate uniforms was the black panels with a green shamrock, reminiscent of the original Celtics uniforms worn in the late 1940s. During its run, the green-and-black alternates were considered 'unlucky' by the team whenever they wore them in the playoffs; the Celtics went 0–8 in these uniforms.

A gray uniform set was also used from 2014 to 2017. Dubbed "Parquet Pride", the uniforms featured sleeves (a prominent figure in Adidas' NBA uniforms), white letters with green trim, the silhouetted leprechaun logo on the shorts, the shamrock logo on the left leg, and a parquet-like pattern on the sides.

For 2017 and beyond, the Celtics will wear black "Statement" uniforms (labeled by Nike in reference to the league's third jerseys). The uniform features a black base with "Celtics" in green lettering and white trim, and other than a few changes in the striping scheme, the uniform remained essentially the same. Starting in 2020, the "Statement" uniform would feature the Air Jordan brand logo, a feature previously exclusive to the Charlotte Hornets uniforms.

==== Special uniforms ====
From 2006 to 2017, the Celtics wore special St. Patrick's Day uniforms. The first version, worn from 2006 to 2013, resembled their regular green uniforms save for gold and white trim and the city name in front. For 2014 and 2015, the uniform resembled the green/black alternate uniform but with sleeves and with the team's name instead of the city's. In 2016 and 2017, the uniforms were again sleeveless and featured the city name in front, but kept the previous striping.

During the NBA Europe Live Tour before the 2007–08 season, the Celtics used the alternate road jerseys in their game against the Toronto Raptors in Rome, except that the words "Boston" on the front side of the jersey and the shamrock on the shorts and on the reverse side of the jersey contained the green, white and red tricolors of the Italian flag. In the second game in London, the regular road jerseys had a patch containing the Union Jack.

At the 2008–09 season opener against the Cleveland Cavaliers, the Celtics wore a modified version of their home uniforms, accented with gold, to commemorate the previous season's championship team.

The Celtics have worn Christmas Day uniforms since the 2008–09 season. For the first four years, they wore their regular green uniforms modified with the NBA logo inside a snowflake. Then in the 2012–13 season, they wore monochrome uniforms with green lettering trimmed in white. For the 2016–17 season, the Celtics wore a special green uniform with a more ornate script lettering, but without the additional striping.

Starting with the 2017–18 season, the Celtics occasionally wore "City" uniforms designed by Nike. Their first such uniforms were in gray and featured a pattern of the parquet floor throughout, a green shamrock with white trim on the left leg, green letters with white trim, Red Auerbach's signature near the uniform tag, and a portion of the 2008 championship banner on the beltline.

For the 2018–19 season, the Celtics wore white "City" uniforms with green letters and shamrocks trimmed in gold. It also has Red Auerbach's signature near the uniform tag and a gold-trimmed alternate Celtics logo on the beltline. In addition, the Celtics wore an "Earned" edition uniform exclusive only to the 16 teams that made the 2018 NBA playoffs. Their rendition is a palette swap of the "City" uniforms with a green base and gold letters and shamrocks with white trim. Both uniforms were inspired by the team's warmup jackets they wore from the 1950s until 1998, which contained a brighter gold trim. The green "Earned" uniform was later repurposed as the Celtics' "City" uniform for the 2026–27 season.

The Celtics' "City" uniform for the 2019–20 season had a green base and a stylized "Boston" wordmark and numbers in gold with black trim. A Celtic knot in the shape of a shamrock adorns the beltline.

The 2020–21 Celtics' "City" uniform was patterned after the 17 championship banners in the TD Garden rafters. The uniform, which is white with thick green stripes, has the full name in Futura Condensed stacked in front. Red Auerbach's signature and quote "The Boston Celtics are not a basketball team. They're a way of life." appears above the manufacturer's tag. The Celtics also released a second "Earned" uniform after qualifying in the 2020 NBA playoffs; this design has a dark green base with Celtic and lime-green striping, and the letters were rendered in Celtic green with white trim.

The Celtics' green "City" uniform for the 2021–22 season was a mix of previous uniform designs. The neck and arm striping was taken from their current uniforms. The green lettering with white drop shadows was a nod to the 1949 uniform design. The gray triangles on the shorts represented the franchise's initial uniforms; the left side contained the team's 75th anniversary emblem, while the right side contained a green-and-white version of the Red Auerbach memorial shamrock used in the 2006–07 season. Contrasting nameplates on the back were inspired by the warmup jackets the team used for much of its history, and the original "jumping leprechaun" logo from the 1960s was added to the waist. Retired numbers, the Auerbach signature and quotation (see 2021 "City" uniform), and 17 shamrocks representing each championship season, surrounded the jock tag.

The 2022–23 "City" uniform served as a memorial to Bill Russell, who died on July 31. The uniform is dark green with metallic gold and black accents, and has the "Celtics" wordmark inspired by the Slade's Bar & Grill restaurant once owned by Russell. The black stripes contained 11 gold diamonds on each side, commemorating each of Russell's championships, and also had a grayscale pattern of the parquet floor. The waistband contained Russell's jersey no. 6 surrounded by the 11 gold diamonds.

The "City" uniform in the 2023–24 season nodded to the origins of the game of basketball. The white-based design had dark green letters and brown trim, alluding to maker's marks from Boston's history of furniture makers, along with woodgrain accents alluding to the peach baskets first used in the game. The Celtics unveiled an alternate court for the 2023 NBA in-season tournament. The design, which is based on the "City" uniform, had a mostly green-painted maple court with a brown strip along the free throw lanes. The silhouette of the NBA Cup is situated along the free throw lanes, and the actual trophy is painted at center court along with the "BOSTON" wordmark.

For the 2024–25 "City" uniform, the Celtics built upon last season's "City" uniform and focused on continuous evolution of the game of basketball. The black-based uniform had "Action green" (neon green) letters and striping, along with futuristic-style numbers.

The Celtics' "City" uniform for the 2025–26 season was based on their 2018–19 "City" uniform, but lacked the green elements. Instead, it has a white base with the block "BOSTON" wordmark, uniform numbers and striping in metallic gold trimmed in black. The uniform paid homage to the franchise's winning tradition.

==== Memorial patches ====
During the 2006–07 season, the Celtics wore a commemorative patch of a black shamrock with the nickname "Red" in green letters on the right top of the jersey in remembrance of Red Auerbach, who died shortly before the season.

The team has honored deceased members of the Celtics family with a commemorative black band on the left shoulder strap of the jersey. It has been worn thirteen times to date: Walter Brown (1964–65), Bob Schmertz (1975–76), Joan Cohen (1989–90), Johnny Most (1992–93), Reggie Lewis (1993–94), Dorothy Auerbach (2000–01), Dennis Johnson (2006–07), Jim Loscutoff (2015–16), Jo Jo White (2017–18), John Havlicek (2018–19), Tom Heinsohn, and K. C. Jones (both 2020–21), Sam Jones (2021–22), and Bill Walton (2023–24). During the 2019–20 season, the Celtics wore a black band in honor of two people who had never been part of the Celtics organization; former NBA commissioner David Stern and former Los Angeles Lakers star Kobe Bryant. The Celtics have also worn a black band for reasons not directly related to the franchise, such as the Boston Marathon bombing in 2013 (later replaced with a dedicated memorial patch), and the death of Isaiah Thomas' younger sister during the 2017 NBA playoffs.

In the 2022–23 season, the Celtics joined the rest of the NBA in wearing the black no. 6 patch in memory of Bill Russell.

==== Uniform traditions ====
The team also had the tradition of wearing black sneakers through most of their history. According to legend, Celtics patriarch Red Auerbach had a problem with the white sneakers, claiming that the white sneakers can easily get dirty; hence starting a long tradition with the black sneakers. In the early 1970s, the Celtics changed their sneaker color to green, but by 1985, returned to the customary black due to the difficulty of producing the right shade of Celtic green.

Before the 2003–04 season, then-Celtics general manager Danny Ainge and captain Paul Pierce suggested wearing white sneakers, in part due to a growing number of teams wearing black sneakers and evolving technology in sneaker manufacturing. Ainge gladly accepted and the white sneakers have remained since on home games. They still wore the black sneakers on away games, and brought them back for all home games during the 2004 NBA playoffs, and in one home game during the 2005 NBA playoffs. In the 2008–09 season, they wore white sneakers with green and gold accents while wearing their St. Patrick's Day jerseys on the road. Most recently, when the Celtics play on Christmas Day, they wore white or green sneakers with red and gold accents. Since the 2009–10 season, the NBA relaxed its rules on specified sneaker colors, and Celtics players are now seen wearing custom-made and personalized sneakers at home and on the road, although for the most part they wear either green, white or black sneakers.

The Celtics were the only team to wear warmup jackets with the player names on the back. During the 1980s, this style was dominant in most NBA warmup jackets, but by the late 1990s, this style gradually declined. The Celtics, however, kept the design in keeping with tradition, before discontinuing the practice after the 2011–12 season in favor of a templated jacket design common to all 30 teams.

== Television and radio ==
NBC Sports Boston is the Boston Celtics' main television outlet, having aired its games since 1981 when the station was known as PRISM New England. In 1983, it rebranded as SportsChannel New England. Like all the other SportsChannel networks, the New England channel was rebranded as Fox Sports New England when former owner Cablevision entered into a partnership with Liberty Media and News Corporation in 1998. Comcast purchased Cablevision's original network stake in 2001, then acquired the remaining stake in what was now FSN New England in 2007 and rebranded the network as Comcast SportsNet New England. In 2017, all CSN networks (including CSN New England) were renamed as NBC Sports Regional Networks in reference to Comcast's current ownership of NBCUniversal.

As of the 2024–25 season, Drew Carter serves as the television play-by-play announcer with Brian Scalabrine as an analyst.

All Celtics games are heard on radio through Beasley Broadcast Group's WBZ-FM (98.5, otherwise branded as "The Sports Hub"), with play-by-play from Sean Grande and color commentary from Cedric Maxwell, a deal in place since the 2013–14 season. It is carried on stations in five of the six New England States via the Boston Celtics Radio Network.

Long-time announcers Johnny Most and Mike Gorman have won the Curt Gowdy Media Award for their outstanding work as broadcasters. Most was the team's radio announcer from 1953 to 1990, and Gorman served as the television announcer from 1981 to 2024.

== Management ==
=== Ownership history ===
Ownership history
Owner	Tenure
Boston Garden-Arena Corporation	June 6, 1946 – July 31, 1950
Walter A. Brown/Lou Pieri	July 31, 1950 – September 7, 1964
Lou Pieri and Marjorie Brown, wife of team founder	September 7, 1964 – June 24, 1965
Marvin Kratter/Knickerbocker Brewing Company, subsidiary of National Equities	June 24, 1965 – 1968
Ballantine Brewery, subsidiary of Investors Funding Corporation	1968–1969; 1971–1972
Trans-National Communications	1969–1971
Irv Levin and Harold Lipton	April 1972 – May 1972*; November 1975 – 1978
Robert Schmertz/Leisure Technology	May 1972 – January 1975
Robert Schmertz/Leisure Technology, Irv Levin, and Harold Lipton	January 1975 – November 1975
John Y. Brown, Jr. and Harry T. Mangurian, Jr.	1978–1979
Harry T. Mangurian, Jr.	1979–1983
Don Gaston, Alan N. Cohen, Paul Dupee	1983–1993
Paul Gaston	1993–2002
Boston Basketball Partners L.L.C.	December 2002 – 2025
William Chisholm, Aditya Mittal	2025–present

*Sale not approved by NBA

=== Team presidents ===
All-time Team presidents
President	Tenure
Walter A. Brown	1946–1963
Louis Pieri	1963–1965
Jack Waldron	1965–1967; 1968–1970
Clarence H. Adams	1967–1968
Red Auerbach	1970–1997; 2001–2006
Rick Pitino	1997–2001
Rich Gotham	2007–present

=== General managers ===
GM history
GM	Tenure
Walter A. Brown	1946–1950
Red Auerbach	1950–1984
Jan Volk	1984–1997
Chris Wallace	1997–2007
Danny Ainge	2007–2021
Brad Stevens	2021–present

=== Other ===
Name	Position	Tenure
Dave Gavitt	CEO	1990–1994
Larry Bird	Special assistant to front office	1992–1997
M. L. Carr	Director of basketball operations	1994–1997
Danny Ainge	President of basketball operations	2003–2021
Brad Stevens	President of basketball operations	2021–present

== See also ==
- The Auerbach Center, official Celtics practice facility (opened June 2018)
- The Sports Museum (at TD Garden)
- Reebok Pro Summer League, a former summer league operated by the Celtics
- List of Boston Celtics head coaches
- Boston Celtics draft history
- Celtics–Lakers rivalry
- Celtics–Knicks rivalry
- Celtics–Pistons rivalry
- 76ers–Celtics rivalry
- Boston Celtics all-time roster
- Boston Garden
- TD Garden
- Boston Celtics Radio Network
- Sports in Massachusetts
- Sports in Boston
- List of NBA champions

== Notes ==
Preceded by Philadelphia Warriors	NBA champions 1956–57	Succeeded by St. Louis Hawks
Preceded by St. Louis Hawks	NBA champions 1958–59, 1959–60, 1960–61, 1961–62, 1962–63, 1963–64, 1964–65, 1965–66	Succeeded by Philadelphia 76ers
Preceded by Philadelphia 76ers	NBA champions 1967–68, 1968–69	Succeeded by New York Knicks
Preceded by New York Knicks	NBA champions 1973–74	Succeeded by Golden State Warriors
Preceded by Golden State Warriors	NBA champions 1975–76	Succeeded by Portland Trail Blazers
Preceded by Los Angeles Lakers	NBA champions 1980–81	Succeeded by Los Angeles Lakers
Preceded by Philadelphia 76ers	NBA champions 1983–84	Succeeded by Los Angeles Lakers
Preceded by Los Angeles Lakers	NBA champions 1985–86	Succeeded by Los Angeles Lakers
Preceded by San Antonio Spurs	NBA champions 2007–08	Succeeded by Los Angeles Lakers
Preceded by Denver Nuggets	NBA champions 2023–24	Succeeded by Oklahoma City Thunder
