= Wyc Grousbeck =

American entrepreneur (born 1961)

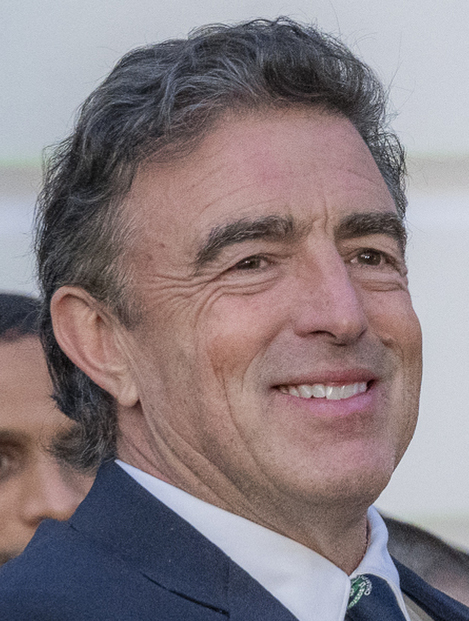
- Grousbeck at the White House in 2024
- Born: Wycliffe K. Grousbeck; June 13, 1961 (age 65); Worcester, Massachusetts, U.S.
- Education: Princeton University (BA); University of Michigan (JD.); Stanford University (MBA)
- Spouses: Corinne Basler (m. 1986; div. 2016) Emilia Fazzalari (m. 2017)
- Children: 2
- Parent(s): H. Irving Grousbeck; Sukey Barber
- Basketball career

Boston Celtics
- Positions: Majority owner & governor (2002–2025); Alternate governor & CEO (2025–present)

Career highlights
- 2× NBA champion (2008, 2024)

Wycliffe K. Grousbeck (born June 13, 1961) is an American entrepreneur who is the alternate governor and CEO of the Boston Celtics of the National Basketball Association (NBA). He previously served as lead owner and governor of the team from 2002 to 2025, winning two NBA Finals during that time.

== Early life and education ==
Grousbeck was born in Worcester, Massachusetts and graduated from Noble and Greenough School in Dedham, Massachusetts. He attended Princeton University, B.A. in history in 1983 and rowed on the 1983 undefeated lightweight crew team that claimed the Ivy League and National rowing championship. Grousbeck earned his J.D. degree from the University of Michigan in 1986 and his M.B.A. in 1992 (Miller Scholar) from the Stanford Graduate School of Business.

== Career ==
After spending seven years as a partner at the venture capital firm, Highland Capital Partners, Grousbeck founded and led the group, Boston Basketball Partners L.L.C., that bought the Boston Celtics for $360 million in 2002. During his time as lead owner, the Celtics won the NBA Finals in 2008 and 2024. They made the playoffs in 20 of Grousbeck's 23 years in charge.

After their second championship win in 2024, Grousbeck and his family revealed their intention to sell the franchise, and on August 19, 2025, he announced the closing of the sale for a record setting $6.1 billion to Bill Chisholm, a managing partner of Symphony Technology Group. At the closing of the sale, it was revealed that Grousbeck currently owns 13% of the team, which although substantial ownership does not permit him to serve as Governor under League rules. Grousbeck is expected to remain with the Celtics until 2028, at which time he would be able to sell his shares to Chisholm at a calculated new team valuation, which may be as high as $7.3 billion.

Besides the Celtics, Grousbeck has had numerous other business ventures. In 2010, he became chairman of the Massachusetts Eye and Ear Infirmary (MEE), a research and clinical hospital specializing in blindness and deafness research. Grousbeck instituted and led a capital campaign that raised $250 million for MEE, and led them to join Mass General Brigham medical system. In 2013, he co-founded Causeway Media Partners, LP, a growth equity partnership managing over $330 million, investing in sports technology and media companies such as Omaze, Inc., Zwift, FloSports, Freeletics, the PGA Tour, and SeatGeek.

Wyc has served as executive producer on two recent Hollywood productions. He co-created and was an executive producer of the 2023 NBC sitcom Extended Family, loosely based on Grousbeck, his wife, and her ex-husband (a lifelong Celtics fan). Grousbeck also appeared in, and was an executive producer of, the critically acclaimed HBO Sports documentary on the Celtics, Celtics City, which aired on HBO Max in 2025.

== Personal life ==
Grousbeck married Emilia Fazzalari in 2017. They joined with fellow NBA owners Michael Jordan, Jeanie Buss, and Wes Edens to found Cincoro Tequila, which launched in September 2019.

In 2022, Princeton University opened a new dormitory, Grousbeck Hall, which was funded through a donation from the Grousbeck family. Grousbeck and Fazzalari also created the Fazzalari Sky Bridge serving Boston Children’s Hospital patients, and they support the Grousbeck Boys and Girls Club of Charlestown.

Grousbeck is an avid rock and blues drummer and guitarist. He has appeared on stage around Boston and New York City with his band French Lick, and the Grammy-nominated James Montgomery Band. Grousbeck has shared bills with such headliners as Billy Idol, Gregg Allman, Lenny Kravitz, the B-52s, Flo Rida, and the J. Geils Band.

Sporting positions
Preceded by Paul Gaston	Boston Celtics principal owner 2002–2025	Succeeded by Bill Chisholm; Aditya Mittal
