= Igal Lichtman =

American businessman

Igal Lichtman, also known by the Internet pseudonym "Mrs. Jello", was the founder, chairman, and chief executive officer (CEO) of Magic Solutions International, Inc., a company that specialized in help desk and asset management software. Lichtman also was a seed investor in targeted advertising network Quigo, sold to America Online in 2007 for US$340 million.

== Biography ==
Lichtman earned a Bachelor of Science in Electrical Engineering (BSEE) from Technion, the Israeli Institute of Technology. He held various positions as an engineer and a programmer. Lichtman also was an officer in the Israeli Air Force.

Lichtman was a co-founder of a prosperous computer/local area network (LAN) value-added reseller (VAR) business that was ranked in the top 100 LAN VAR's in the U.S. between 1986 and 1988.

=== Magic Solutions ===
Lichtman found the company in 1988 with headquarters in Paramus, New Jersey. Magic Solutions International, Inc. (known as "Magic Solutions") specialized in help desk automation and asset management software. The company was an unplanned spin-off from a computer systems integrator, later becoming one of the most successful independent software vendors on the East Coast of the U.S. during the 1990s.

At inception, the company had a single programmer servicing one customer. At its height, Magic Solutions has 300 employees, 6,000 customers, and annual trailing sales over US$50 million. In 1996 and 1997, Magic Solutions was one of the Inc. 500 fastest growing companies in the U.S. In April 1998, it was acquired by Network Associates Inc. (NETA) (McAfee Inc, as of July 2004) for US$110 million.

In 1997, search technology Magic Solutions created was licensed to Microsoft for use in the "TechNet" product.

=== Post-Magic Solutions ===
After the sale of Magic Solutions, Lichtman built or funded a number of high-technology startup companies, including iBoogie.com; TrafficMedia, responsible for the "Vortalizer Technology" innovation; Quigo.com; and Domainspa.com, built on an early "pay per click" internet advertising business model.

During this period, Lichtman also worked with virtual reality, producing the website Jerusalem.com, where visitors adopted an avatar to navigate a virtual tour of Jerusalem.

== Charity work ==
Lichtman's charity work included serving on the board of the Friends of the Israel Defense Forces and endowing a wing to the Israel National Museum of Science, Technology, and Space (also known as "MadaTech").

== Awards ==
In 1996, Lichtman was awarded the Ernst & Young New Jersey Entrepreneur of the Year Award in the "Software" category, and Magic Solutions ranked No. 238 in the 1996 Inc. 500 after growing more than 1,000 percent over five years.

== Death ==
Lichtman died on February 18, 2013, from cancer.
