= Boundy =

Boundy is a surname. Notable people with the surname include:

- Craig Boundy (born 1974), British corporate executive
- David Boundy (1932–2003), Australian politician
- Gerald Boundy (1895–1964), English cricketer

== See also ==
- Sirifila-Boundy, commune in the Ségou Region of Mali
