= IDG Ventures =

Global family of venture funds

- Type: Private
- Industry: Private equity
- Founded: 1996; 30 years ago
- Founder: International Data Group
- Headquarters: San Francisco, California, U.S.
- Products: Venture capital
- AUM: $6.8 billion
- Parent: IDG Capital
- Website: www.idgventures.com

IDG Ventures is a global family of venture funds with approximately $3.6 billion under management. All of the funds were originally sole-source-funded by International Data Group.

The first fund was created by IDG in 1996 and was located in San Francisco, California. The latest San Francisco fund, formed in 2007, accepted other institutional investors in addition to IDG, which remains a major investor. In 2000, IDG started a fund in Europe; this fund is now closed. In 2001, IDG started a fund in Boston, also named IDG Ventures. The manager of the Boston fund renamed itself Flybridge Capital Partners in 2008 and is no longer associated with the IDG Ventures funds. In the 2000s, IDG started funds in Vietnam, India, and Korea. As of 2013, there are five countries with IDG funds — China, Vietnam, India, Korea and the United States (San Francisco).

In January 2017, IDG Capital and China Oceanwide Holdings Group acquired International Data Group (IDG) and its subsidiaries. IDG Capital became the controlling shareholder of IDG Ventures.

== Venture Capital Investments ==
Year	Company	Industry
2001	Shazam	Music identification application
2008	Aujas Networks	Cybersecurity
2011	Lenskart	Indian-based eyewear company
2013	Appboy	New York City-based mobile marketing automation company
2015	Baofeng	Chinese online video platform
2015	Survata	Market research & survey respondents
2015	ICrushIFlush	Dating app
2015	Aasaanjobs.com	Indian entry-level recruitment portal
2015	Tripoto	Travel portal
