= Alpha Chi Alpha =

Social fraternity at Dartmouth College, U.S

- ΑΧΑ
- Dartmouth ΑΧΑ house
- Founded: May 21, 1963; 63 years ago Dartmouth College
- Type: Social
- Affiliation: Independent
- Status: Active
- Scope: Local
- Motto: Fidelis et Suavis
- Colors: Red and Black
- Symbol: White Horse
- Chapters: 1
- Headquarters: 13 Webster Avenue; Hanover, New Hampshire 03755; United States
- Website: www.alphachialpha.org

Alpha Chi Alpha (ΑΧΑ or Alpha Chi) is a local social fraternity at Dartmouth College in Hanover, New Hampshire. It was established as an independent fraternity in 1963, after having first been a chapter of Alpha Chi Rho and part of the local fraternity Gamma Delta Chi. The fraternity occupies a chapter house that is owned by the college.

== History ==
In March 1917, twelve Dartmouth College students formed the Epsilon Kappa Alpha fraternity. In 1919, this group became the Phi Nu chapter of the national fraternity, Alpha Chi Rho. In the early 1930s, it declined drastically due to several new fraternities on campus and financial difficulties caused by the Great Depression. In 1935, Alpha Chi Rho merged with campus chapters of Lambda Chi Alpha, Phi Kappa Sigma, and Alpha Sigma Phi to create a new fraternity, Gamma Delta Chi.

On March 9, 1957, 24 undergraduates broke from Gamma Delta Chi and reactivated the Phi Nu chapter of Alpha Chi Rho. The revived Alpha Chi Rho chapter moved into a house on Webster Avenue, which was purchased and renovated by the college.

In the spring of 1963, a committee of members met and recommended a break from Alpha Chi Rho. The national fraternity required members to "accept Jesus as their lord and savior," a tenet that brothers at the Dartmouth chapter strongly disagreed with. An overburdening financial obligation to the national fraternity may have been another consideration. On May 21, 1963, the Pi Nu chapter voted to disaffiliate from Alpha Chi Rho and to form the local fraternity Alpha Chi Alpha. Alpha Chi Alpha continues to occupy the Wester Avenue chapter house.

Timeline of events in AXA's history
Important dates in the history of Alpha Chi Alpha
1917	Formation of Epsilon Kappa Alpha, local fraternity
1919	Becomes the Phi Nu chapter of Alpha Chi Rho
1935	Merged with ΑΣΦ, ΦΚΣ, and ΛΧΑ to become Gamma Delta Chi.
1957	Split with GDX reforms Phi Nu chapter of AXP
1963	Became Alpha Chi Alpha (AXA).
1975	AXA hosts its first annual winter Beach Party
1979	Third floor added to the house
1988	AXA hosts its first annual spring Pigstick party
2004	House undergoes multimillion-dollar renovation.
2009	Alpha Chi hosts the first annual black ice party
2022	Alpha Chi hosts the first annual Ski Darty event

== Symbols ==
Alpha Chi Alpha's motto is Fidelis et Suavis. The fraternity's colors are red and black. Its symbol is the white horse. Its nickname is Alpha Chi.

Alpha Chi Alpha pledges are recognized by their "sirens", red baseball cap-like headwear, which they wear for the duration of their pledge term.

== Chapter house ==
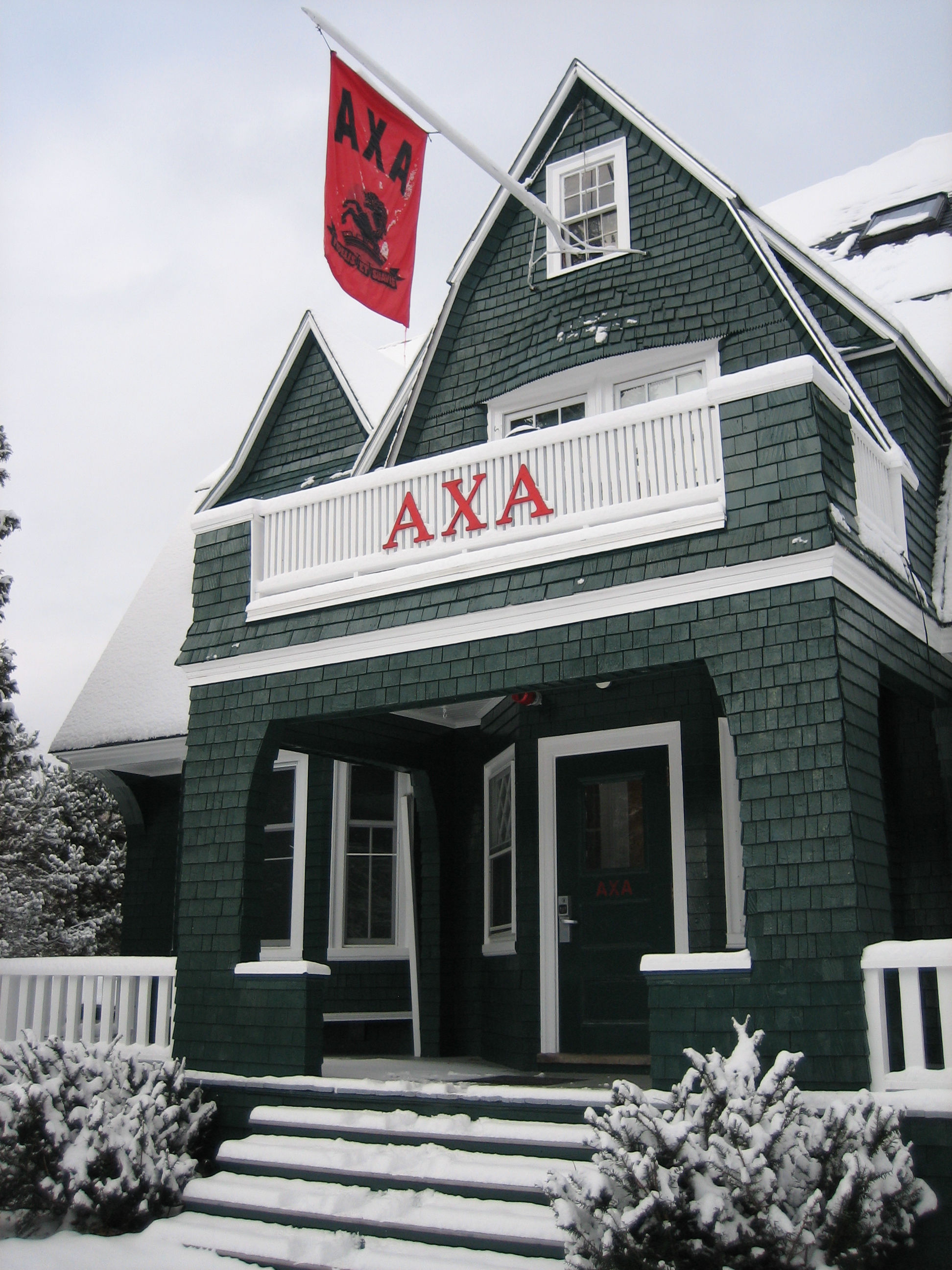
Alpha Chi Alpha chapter house

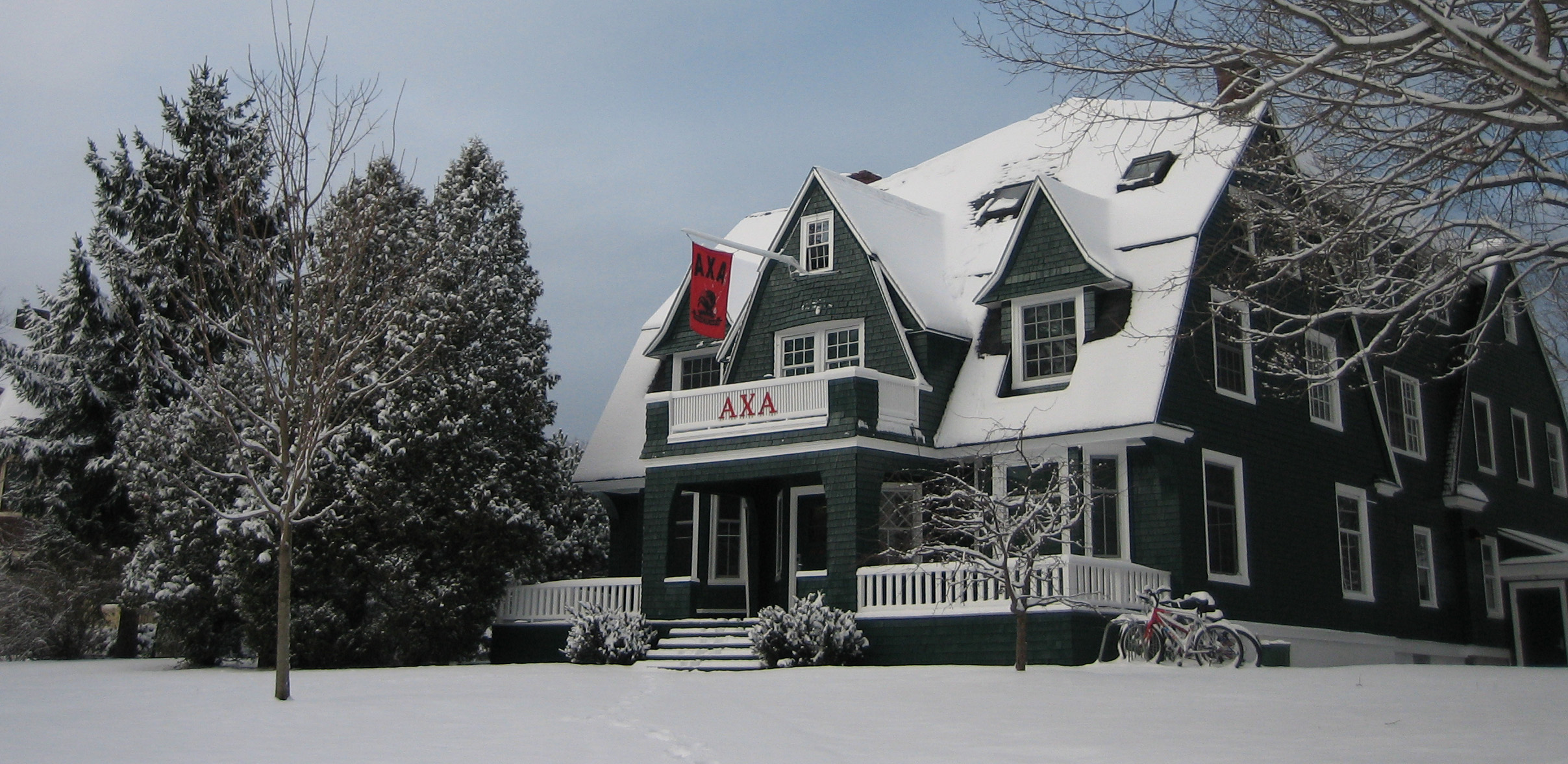
Alpha Chi Alpha chapter house

Alpha Chi Alpha's chapter house is located at 13 Webster Avenue on the Dartmouth College campus, directly across from the college president's house. The green-shingled house is nicknamed the "Magic Green Cottage" and the "Cheese Lodge" by its members and can house 21 members.

Professor Fred Emery purchased the vacant lot on May 5, 1896, and constructed the house in 1898. Later owners sold the house to the college in March 1957, and it has been leased by the fraternity ever since. The college, as the fraternity's landlord, takes care of all major structural repairs The living room and the second floor above it were added in May 1963. The addition of a third floor resulted from the efforts of member Bob Ceplikas. During the summer of 1985, the college spent over $180,000 on major renovations.

Costing $1.3 million, the 2004 renovations involved the razing of a structure that was once known as the Emory Barn or simply the Barn. A concrete hallway called the Slide was constructed at some point, adjoining the fraternity's physical plant and the Barn. The Barn was one of the most distinctive social atmospheres on Dartmouth's campus and was cherished by the fraternity. The second floor of the Barn, known as the Upstairs Barn, housed three brothers each term. The basement, along with the new main floor area and recently refurbished tube room, has replaced the Barn and the old front room as the primary social spaces for the fraternity.

== Activities ==
The fraternity hosts over 600 guests for the Beach Party during Winter Carnival, and also for a Pigstick BBQ each spring on the first Saturday in May.

== Notable members ==
- Jim Coulter, co-founder of private equity firm TPG Capital
- John Hoeven, senior United States senator from North Dakota, former governor of North Dakota
- Christopher Miller, co-director of Cloudy with a Chance of Meatballs, 21 Jump Street, The Lego Movie, and 22 Jump Street
- Jake Tapper, chief Washington D.C. correspondent and daily news anchor for CNN
- Bill Chisholm, founder, managing partner, and chief investment officer of STG Partners, owner of the Boston Celtics

== See also ==
- College fraternities and sororities
- Dartmouth College fraternities and sororities
- List of social fraternities
