= Greenkeepers =

International NGO

- Formation: August 2009
- Founder: Kevin Xiao, Vivian Xiao, Olivia Tan, Jeffrey Yu, Philipa Yu, Laura Du
- Location: Beijing, Fremont, Jakarta
- Services: Service group, Environmentalist organization
- Fremont: Jessica Lu, Hema Madichetty, Meher Mehta, Aneri Sheth, Anika Wadhera, Patrick Wang
- Beijing: Philipa Yu, Rachel Wang, Dion Dong, Quinn Sullivan, Yasmine Ross, Karina Zeng, Cindy Wei, Sydney, Amy Li, Kevin Wu
- Jakarta: Naiara Wuisan, Stacy Sada, Chrystabelle Keilana Adianca
- Volunteers: Students, 300+ members

Greenkeepers is an international, non-profit, and non-governmental service organization founded in 2009. Founded in Beijing, China, Greenkeepers is devoted to inspiring environmental awareness through local impacts within communities across the globe, including but not limited to its offices in Beijing, Fremont, and Jakarta. Greenkeepers aspires to fundamentally change the way people see environmental work, and is renowned within local communities for its approach of leading by example - not only transforming the environment or promoting environmental awareness, but also redesigning societies' consumptions of limited resources.

In its lifetime, Greenkeepers has initiated various projects in local, regional, and global scales. Notable accomplishments and on-going projects include the Dragon Path River Cleanup, the Sichuan Book Drive, the Beijing Tree Planting Initiative, and the Food Waste Reduction Initiative.

== History ==
=== Founding ===
Greenkeepers was founded in August 2009 in Beijing, China by Kevin Xiao, Vivian Xiao, Olivia Tan, Jeffrey Yu, Philipa Yu, and Laura Du. The idea for Greenkeepers arose during a trash pick-up event organized by the Beijing Student Press Association, of which each founder was a part of. According to the Greenkeepers website, an elderly woman approached then 9th grade Jeffery Yu with an empty bottle, encouraging him to sell it and buy himself a snack on the way home. Though an initially humorous experience, the founding members realized the story was indicative of a larger underlying problem within the Beijing local community; namely that in China, no one recognized the merits of environmental conservation. As co-founder Philipa Yu recounts, “Locals picked up recyclable material for the sole purpose of later selling it and earning a little extra pocket money. Otherwise, trash was left unattended to.”

Based on the need to shift society's views on the environment, Greenkeepers was born. Its goal since then has been to foster a sense of respect for the environment and to encourage the local community to be aware of the effects of their actions.

=== 2009-2015: Development ===
In its early stages, Greenkeepers meetings were largely informal - carried out on couches in libraries and in various people's houses. It remained as a 6-member group and did very little in terms of quantifiable actions; instead, time was spent clearing procedural hurdles involved in establishing an organization within the students' school.

The largest problem Greenkeepers faced at this time was on deciding the exact nature of the group - what it would do and focus on. After much deliberation, the founders agreed that Greenkeepers would be heavily action oriented and thus, it became vital that the group remained small. Today, one of Greenkeepers' core values is that a small group of dedicated individuals is more beneficial than a large organization with only a few members who truly believe in the cause.

=== 2014-2018: US Branch ===
Greenkeepers USA branch was built with the idea to spread sustainable practices around the world. It began in 2014 and gained a following around the Bay Area, namely Fremont.

Some of the big projects this branch completed were the Los Gatos Creek Cleanup, and e-waste and recycling drive, and workshops such as the #Sprout v2.0 that gave volunteers experience with farming and technology that affects the environment. Additionally, the team also participated in a FIERCE Green Summit, took a Water Treatment Research trip to Alameda County, and held an environmentally friendly online challenge called the Greenkeepers 14 Day Project.

=== 2019-2020: USA Reboot ===
Unfortunately, the Greenkeepers branch at USA was forgotten for a while until new core members decided to reboot the program in 2019. With a successful reboot, the Fremont branch is dedicated to raising awareness and making improvements in the environment of local communities.

With members communicating between two high schools, the team worked on several service projects, a food waste reduction initiative, a composting system implementation, an online 21 day green challenge, and more.

=== 2023-present: Indonesia Branch ===
Greenkeepers Indonesia Branch was incepted in 2023 under the head founding of Shinyeong (Erica) Moon and the co-founding of Minjung Kim, Chaewon Lee, and Jodie Kim.

It was established to spread environmental conservatism in Jakarta, Indonesia's capital. It has primarily been active in Jakarta Intercultural School, an international school the founders attend.

== Beijing Projects ==
=== Dragon Path River Cleanup ===
Greenkeepers attempted to impact the greater Beijing community by cleaning up a section of the Long Dao River in a nearby community. Students from the International School of Beijing and Kong Gang Elementary school gathered together and cleaned up miscellaneous trash along the river bed.

=== Sichuan Book Drive ===
Over 7000 books were donated to the Huili County Experiment Middle School, Huili County Second Primary School, and Zhaojue County Middle School in the Sichuan province of China.

=== Beijing Tree Planting ===
The Beijing Tree Planting activity provided members of the local community an opportunity to give back to their environment. Greenkeepers launched this project to tackle the growing problems of Beijing's, and China in general's pollution. Its goal was to not only reduce pollution, but also to stop it at its source by encouraging people to adopt greener methods of living. Over 1000 trees have been planted in Beijing since.

=== Tree Labeling ===
During the time of the 2008 Beijing Olympics, students of the Greenkeepers attempted to educate members of the International School of Beijing community of the types of plantation on campus. Greenkeepers members printed labels, for each type of plantation on campus, on recycled paper with only black and white ink, and attached it to plants all over the school. Over 300 trees have been labelled.

=== Awareness Activities ===
==== Mug Sponsoring ====
To curb the usage of paper cups or disposable plastic bottles, Greenkeepers promoted the use of reusable cups and mugs.

==== Science Safari ====
To promote environmental awareness and protection within children of younger ages, Greenkeepers launched its Science Safari to educate younger children of prominent environmental issues.

==== Paper Towel Campaign ====
Greenkeepers noticed that among the local community, there was little regard for paper usage, namely that of napkins and paper towels. In order to reduce the harm done to forests through the use of so many pieces of paper, signs were established, across the local community in Beijing. In places like coffee shops and restaurants, Paper Towel conservation posters attempt to raise awareness and educate the public about environmental friendliness. More than 100 labels have been set up.

== Annual Events ==
=== Earth Day Overnight Campout ===
During the annual Earth Day Overnight Campout event, members of the local community gather to reduce electricity usage by living on the International School of Beijing campus for one electricity-free night. Thus, members of local communities show their respect and acknowledgement of the cause to reduce electricity usage worldwide.

=== Unplugged Concert ===
The yearly Unplugged Concert, as with the Earth Day Overnight Campout, also draws attention to society's prevalent use of electricity in the 21st century. Performances are done without the use of electronic equipment, usually solely based upon a performer's voice or abilities with musical instruments. The concert not only raises money for the cause, but also allows community members to gather and appreciate the idea of energy conservation.

== Fremont Projects ==
=== 21 Day Challenge ===
In the Greenkeepers 21-Day Challenge, participants completed a task everyday that helped keep them busy during the coronavirus pandemic and more importantly, help the environment. For each day they took part in the challenge, they uploaded their proof under the hashtag #GK21Days and got an entry into a raffle to win a 20 dollar gift card or gift.

=== Leaf Mulch Party ===
Despite windy conditions, members worked with LEAF, a non-profit with the mission to grow sustainable pesticide-free food, to build a new farm right in the heart of Fremont. Members began the first step by preparing the ground with sheet mulch. This process helps the normally dry soil absorb water and increase its fertility, fostering the growth of healthy plants.

=== Sabercat Creek Restoration ===
Members from Greenkeepers worked with the City of Fremont on the restoration of the Sabercat Creek. They helped remove various invasive plants and poisonous hemlock.

=== Food Waste Reduction Initiative ===
Partnering with StopWaste, a public agency reducing waste in the Alameda county, members are raising awareness on America's overconsumption patterns, specifically in the field of food waste. Students are starting small in their local high schools to implement compost bins and boxes to reduce the amount of food ending up in landfills, and plan to revamp the school's food-share program to reduce food wastage.

=== Recycle Crafts Workshop ===
An afterschool arts and crafts workshop was hosted with Harvey Green Elementary. There, members informed elementary school students about the intricacy of recycling. All the material for the workshop was reused from cardboard, plastic caps, paper, etc.; This event serves as a gateway to promote future generations to recycle, reuse, and reduce.

=== Litter Pickup ===
Greenkeepers partnered with the City of Fremont to host a litter pickup event for high school students to get involved in making Lake Elizabeth, Central Park, a more beautiful place. More than 40 students attended to pick up trash from the park and recreational area.

=== Recycling Drive ===
As Greenkeepers USA was starting to get established, members started out with a simple project in order to consolidate a following within the local area, as well as to educated nearby neighborhoods in the benefits of practicing recycling.

=== #SproutGK ===
SproutGK was a workshop/gardening event organized by Greenkeepers and conducted at LEAF Stone Garden. Participants attended workshops where they developed problem-solving skills and learned about sustainable solutions. Participants also grew produce that went to the Tri-City Food Bank.

== Jakarta Projects ==
=== Online Advocacy Campaign ===
Greenkeepers posted informational posts on Instagram every month regarding an environmental issue specific to Indonesia. The goal was to raise awareness of local issues among the population and suggest specific ways to target such issues.

=== Battery Recycling Drive ===
Greenkeepers proposed and implemented the first-ever battery recycling system at Jakarta Intercultural School. As Jakarta does not offer municipality-centered battery recycling, expats and locals alike were dismissing the potential of soil degradation and water containment from improper battery disposal and throwing away batteries with general waste. By pitching to the school board, Greenkeepers secured a 7.5 million IDR funding for a 1-year contract period with a local battery processing company and placed bins around campus. Bins were accessible to approximately 2700 community members. As of October 2024, 44.8kg of batteries have been collected.

== Structure of Organization ==
=== Management ===
Greenkeepers is an entirely student run service organization. Each local branch consists of a general leadership team, known as the "core team," that facilitates group meetings. Each core member is in charge of a small focus group tasked with spearheading its own initiative such as fundraising or public relations. Although only one group is in charge of organizing and leading a specific endeavor, each member of a Greenkeepers branch contributes in the project's success. The executive team of Greenkeepers International is the core team centered in Beijing, while the non-profit organization in the U.S. is headquartered in Fremont. As of 2021, the Fremont branch is managed by six individuals – Jessica Lu, Hema Madichetty, Arohi Chirputkar, Aneri Sheth, and Kaylee Wei.

=== Members ===
Members of Greenkeeepers enjoy a high degree of freedom. Although Greenkeepers has its set in stone annual events and projects, members have the options to join existing task groups or to start their own. They are fully able to pursue their own creative ideas and desires with the backing of Greenkeepers' local connections and access to resources.

As of January 2015, Greenkeepers has had a total of over 300 members in its lifetime. As a student-run organization, members hail from various walks of the community. In its Beijing branch, Greenkeepers is almost entirely consisted of international high school students. Nevertheless, the organization enjoys a relatively small and limited local following.

Although high school students primarily make up the organization, Greenkeepers has immense presence within younger age groups as well - in accordance with its goal of spreading environmental awareness.

In Fremont there are 6 core members and 11 general members, all of which are high schoolers in the community. Everyone participates in a few projects that are aimed to help the local environment.

In Jakarta, as its recent inception currently engaged members remain at the founding members.
