= Zachary Cale =

American songwriter and musician

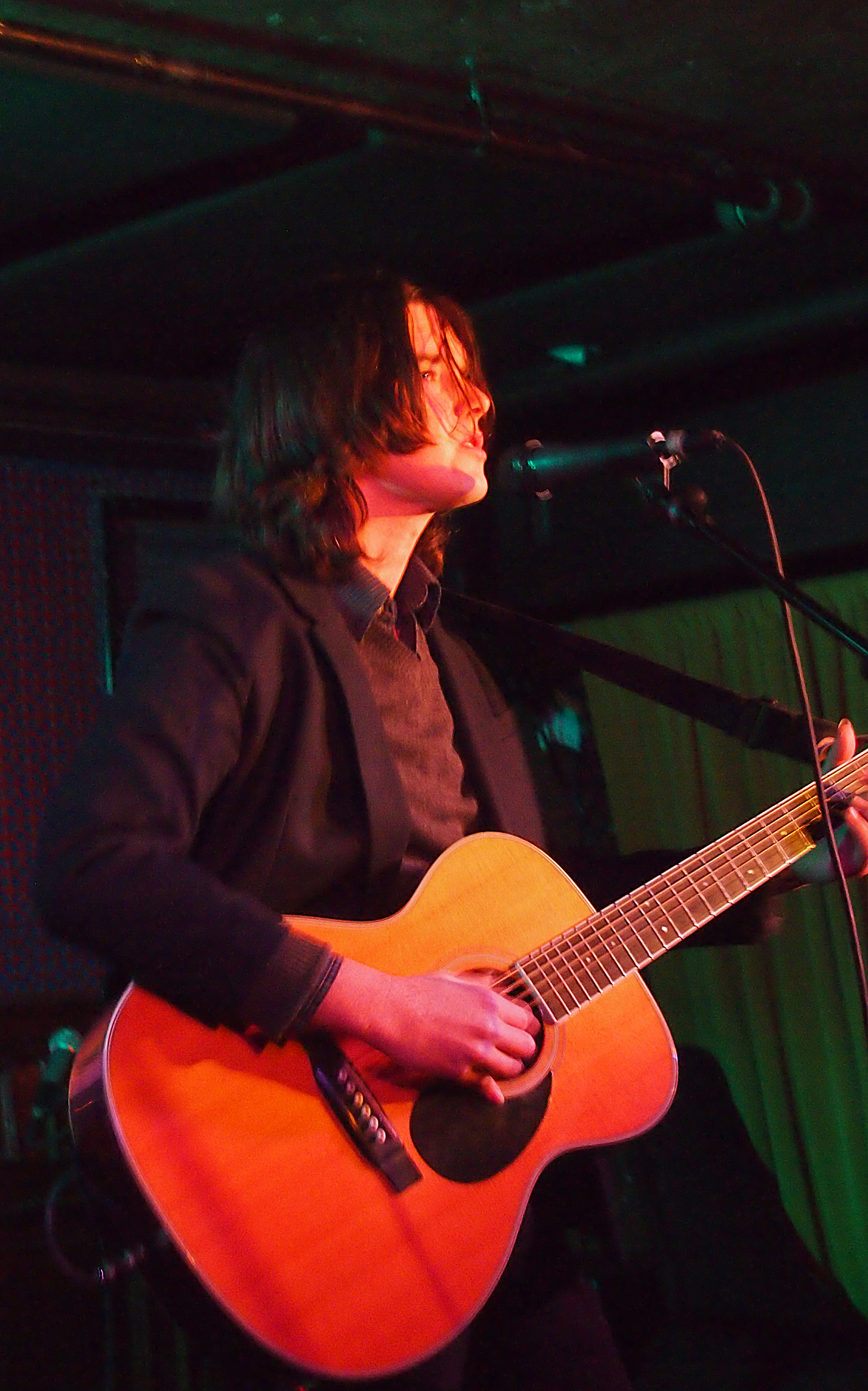
- Zachary Cale at Union Hall, Brooklyn, NY, March 2, 2013

Background information
- Born: November 12, 1978 (age 47)
- Origin: Louisiana
- Genres: Folk, Neofolk, Rock
- Years active: 2005–present
- Labels: New World of Sound, All Hands Electric, Adagio 830, JellyFant
- Website: zacharycale.com

Zachary Cale (born 1978) is an American songwriter and musician who grew up in Louisiana but currently lives in Brooklyn, NY. His music combines elements of folk, country, blues, rock and pop styles. His "moody lyrics and accomplished guitar playing have drawn comparisons to Leonard Cohen and John Fahey, and his voice, in its lower register, is eerily reminiscent of early Bob Dylan." He has also been compared to Townes Van Zandt, John Martyn, Donovan, and Nick Drake, and his music has been described as both "emotionally resonant" and "delicate".

== Music career ==
=== 2005 to 2008 ===
In 2005, Cale's debut album, Outlander Sessions, was released on New World of Sound Records.

This same year he was invited by CFA (Contemporary Fine Arts) gallery in Berlin to perform songs in an art installation entitled "Mutter" that was created by visual artists Jonathan Meese and Tal R and initially set up at the Statens Museum for Kunst (Copenhagen, Denmark). Cale also traveled with the show performing in the Diechtorhallen in Hamburg, Germany, the Frankfurt Art Fair, and at Bortolami Dayan Gallery in New York.

Later in 2005, in the space that once housed Bearsville Studios, he began recording his second album, Walking Papers. Three years after it was recorded, the album was released in December 2008 via All Hands Electric. In 2008 he also released a full band rock album under the name, Illuminations.

=== 2011 to 2015 ===
2011 saw the release of Cale's third album, Noise of Welcome, which caught the attention of Dan Bejar of Destroyer. In September 2013, Cale released Blue Rider, "...a departure from the more robust compositions contained in 2011's Noise of Welcome, ...[diving] deep into heartland-lovin' minimalism." 2015 saw the release of Cale's Duskland on No Quarter Records, "an album of fleeting, thorny significance." spun with "gentle allegories with varied but minimal instrumentation."

=== Live shows ===
Zachary Cale has toured the US and Europe, and has shared stages with Kurt Vile, Deer Tick, Foxygen, Yeasayer, Michael Chapman, Wooden Wand, Gary War, The Black Swans, Julianna Barwick, Martha Wainwright, Six Organs of Admittance, O'Death, Justin Townes Earle, Hiss Golden Messenger, and Robyn Hitchcock. He has played international music festivals such as Incubate (festival), Reeperbahn Festival, CMJ Music Marathon, and the End of the Road Festival in Dorset, UK, in October 2013 he opened for the band Crystal Stilts on a US tour, and opened for Dan Bejar's (Destroyer) solo tour in Fall 2016.

=== All Hands Electric ===
Cale also co-runs the Brooklyn, independent record label, All Hands Electric, with visual artist Ryan Johnson and musician/graphic designer Alfra Martini.

== Discography ==
=== Albums ===
- Outlander Sessions (New World of Sound, 2005)
- Walking Papers (All Hands Electric, 2008)
- See-Saw (as Illuminations, All Hands Electric, 2008)
- Noise of Welcome (All Hands Electric/Adagio 830, 2011)
- Blue Rider (Electric Ragtime/All Hands Electric/JellyFant, 2013)
- Duskland (No Quarter, 2015)
- Love's Work (2025)

=== Singles ===
- "Come Quietly" (All Hands Electric, 2010)
- "Love Everlasting" (Dull Knife, 2012)
