= Hans Pässler =

German surgeon and lecturer (1940-2018)

- Born: 14 July 1940; Dresden, Germany
- Died: 21 January 2018 (aged 77)
- Occupations: Surgeon, lecturer

Hans Pässler (14 July 1940, in Dresden – 21 January 2018) was a German knee surgeon and college lecturer. Pässler published three books and made numerous book contributions, as well as over 200 publications in journals.

== Medical career ==
Between 1961 and 1967 Pässler studied medicine in Kiel. In 1967, he took his state examination and received his medical licence. From 1967 to 1969 he was assistant physician at the university of Heidelberg’s Krehlklinik and had the chance to work with Prof. Schettler, a pioneer in the domain of arteriosclerosis research. From 1969 to 1970, Pässler completed a one-year fellowship in cardiovascular surgery with Prof. Michael E. DeBakey. This was during the era of the first heart transplants and the beginnings of coronary surgery. From 1970 to 1972, Pässler worked as scientific assistant to Prof. Burri in the surgery department at the University of Ulm. Between 1973 and 1977 he was a senior physician in Lindau and in Frankfurt. During this time he also specialised in trauma surgery. From 1978 to 1992, he was chief of surgery and traumatology at the county hospital in Bopfingen.

In 1986, Pässler became vice president of the Collège Européenne de Traumatologie du Sport (CETS). In 1992, he was visiting lecturer at the University of Pittsburgh (Freddie Fu, MD) before becoming chief of the Sportklinik Stuttgart. He held this post until 1993. In the same year, he co-founded the European Federation of National Associations of Orthopedic Sports Traumatology (EFOST).

From 1993 onwards, Pässler became an attending physician at the Atos Praxisklinik in Heidelberg, where he also held the post of medical director between 1997 and 2000. In 1994, Pässler founded the Georg Noulis Fellowship offering young Greek orthopaedic doctors the opportunity to complete a one-year specialised training in knee surgery and sports traumatology. Twenty Greek doctors had completed the fellowship programme by January 2014. The fellowship was named after the original discoverer of the Lachman-Test, a test for ligament stability. In 2000, Pässler founded an additional fellowship programme; by January 2014 it had been completed by 14 Chinese doctors. In 2001, Pässler was visiting lecturer at the departement of orthopaedic surgery at the University of Ioannina. In 2002, he was visiting lecturer at the Chinese General Hospital PLA Beijing (Prof. Wang, MD). In 2003, he was visiting lecturer at the University of Athens (Prof. Soukacos, MD) and in 2005 at the University of Perugia (Prof. Cerulli, MD). From 2009, Pässler taught a bachelor course in physiotherapy at the Berufsakademie Nordhessen, Germany. He was founder of the German internet platforms Vorsicht Operation and Medexo that offer patients second medical opinions over the internet.

== Awards ==
- 1987 Science Award of the German Association of Trauma Medicine (Deutsche Gesellschaft für Unfallheilkunde): „The Lachman Test for Radiology“( Pässler HH, Maerz S: Der radiologische Lachman-Test. "Eine einfache und sichere Methode zum Nachweis von Kreuzbandschäden". Unfallchirurgie 12: 295–300, 1986.)
- 1996 Herodicus Award of the American Society of Orthopaedic Sports Medicine for his publication: Cameron M., Pässler H.H., Vogt M., Thonar E., Evans Ch.H.: "The Natural History of the ACL Deficient Knee: Changes in Synovial Fluid Cytokine and Keratin Sulfate Concentrations". Lecture held at the Second World Congress on Sports Trauma / AOSSM 22nd Annual Meeting, Orlando, USA 1996

== Books ==
- Die Chirurgie des vorderen Kreuzbandes (Fischer-Verlag, 1996)ISBN 3-437-21088-2
- Kreuzbandchirurgie (Johann Ambrosius Barth Verlag, 1997)ISBN 3-335-00493-0
- Neue Techniken – Kniechirurgie (Steinkopf-Verlag, Darmstadt, Germany, 2002, (ISBN 3-7985-1227-2) Second edition in English New Techniques in Knee Surgery 2003, Spanish edition 2003, Chinese edition 2004, Russian, Greek und Italian editions in preparation)
