= Skyhigh Security =

Cloud security software company

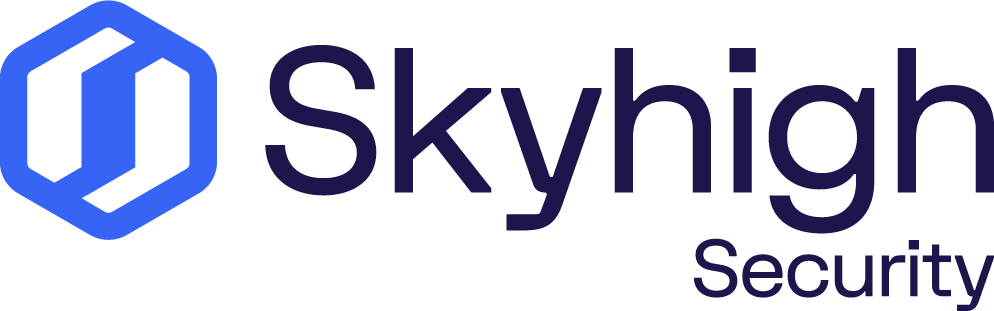
- Formerly: Skyhigh Networks
- Company type: Private company
- Industry: Data security, Network security, computer security, Internet security
- Founded: 2011; 14 years ago
- Founder: Kaushik Narayan, Rajiv Gupta, Sekhar Sarukkai
- Headquarters: San Jose, California, U.S.
- Area served: Worldwide
- Key people: Vishal Rao, CEO Danny Ward, SVP, Finance Ken Schock, Chief Revenue Officer Thyaga Vasudevan, EVP of Products
- Website: www.skyhighsecurity.com

Skyhigh Security is a cloud security company, with headquarters in San Jose, California. The company offers enterprise cloud security services.

== History ==
Skyhigh Networks was founded in 2011 by Rajiv Gupta, Sekhar Sarukkai and Kaushik Narayan to protect an organization's sensitive data by providing visibility, control, and usage of cloud services.

On November 27, 2017, McAfee, an American global computer security software company, announced a definitive agreement to acquire Skyhigh Networks. The deal closed in January 2018.

In March 2021, McAfee announced that its enterprise business was acquired by private equity firm Symphony Technology Group (STG) for US $4 billion. and in March 2022, STG relaunched the cloud portfolio, including the former Skyhigh Networks, as Skyhigh Security.
