= Atika Shubert =

American CNN journalist

- Born: Atika Lynn Shubert
- Education: Tufts University
- Occupation: Journalist
- Spouses: 1
- Children: 1

Atika Lynn Shubert is an American journalist based in Valencia, Spain, covering Europe for CNN. Before her promotion she was based in Berlin and in London. Prior to working for CNN, she was a correspondent for The Washington Post and The New Zealand Herald in Indonesia as she speaks both English and Indonesian fluently. She is a graduate of the Class of 1991 of Jakarta International School. She is an economics graduate of Tufts University in Medford, Massachusetts, US.

== Career ==
Shubert started her career with CNN as a producer in Jakarta, Indonesia, where she covered the fall of Indonesia's long-time dictator Suharto in 1998 and East Timor's transition to independence in 1999. Shubert joined CNN as a reporter for CNN's Jakarta bureau, and was appointed to the position of Tokyo correspondent in 2004. During her time reporting from Tokyo, Shubert covered a number of major news stories in Japan, including the controversial deployment of Japan's Self-Defense Forces, the Japanese hostage situation in Iraq and the verdict of Shoko Asahara (the mastermind behind the 1995 sarin gas attack in Tokyo). In the summer of 2005, Shubert reported live from Hiroshima on the commemoration of the 60th anniversary of the 1945 atomic bombing for CNN's special Remembering Hiroshima. She also reported on the nuclear tensions in the Korean Peninsula in 2006, after North Korea tested nuclear weapons.

CNN claims that Shubert was one of the first CNN correspondents to report on the 2004 Indian Ocean earthquake and tsunami, reporting from Aceh, Indonesia, where she was vacationing at the time. Also in Indonesia, Shubert covered a number of major new events that included the 2002 Bali bombings, the fall of President Abdurrahman Wahid and the installation of Vice President Megawati Sukarnoputri as his successor (2001), the resurgence of the Free Aceh separatist movement, and the religious conflict in the Moluccas. Shubert also briefly covered the Schapelle Corby verdict in Bali; however, due to the time-consuming and overall expensive nature of this landmark court case, CNN eventually opted to run stock footage obtained from its Australian network affiliates instead of direct reporting. Shubert has also contributed reports from the Philippines and Singapore.

From 2008 until 2015 Shubert was based in the CNN London bureau covering stories from around the UK and Europe. She relocated to Berlin in June 2015 to cover Germany and Europe.

== Interview with Julian Assange ==
In October 2010, Shubert interviewed WikiLeaks founder Julian Assange shortly after his organization released classified US military documents related to the Iraq War. After asking him questions about internal issues related to Wikileaks itself, she began asking questions about his alleged sexual assaults. Assange stated that if this line of questioning continued, as opposed to being asked questions directly related to the leaked documents, he would leave the interview. Shubert persisted in her line of questioning, and Assange walked out of the interview.

== Education ==
- Tufts University (1995)
- Jakarta International School (1991)
