= Harman Connected Services =

American software company and subsidiary

- Formerly: Teleca & Symphony Teleca
- Type: Subsidiary
- Industry: Telecom, Outsourcing
- Founded: 2001
- Headquarters: Mountain View, United States
- Areas served: Worldwide Asia, Europe, North America
- Revenue: $2.5 Billion (2014)
- Number of employees: 30,000+ (2018)
- Parent: Harman International Industries
- Website: Harman.com

Harman Connected Services, often abbreviated to HCS, is an American software company which is a subsidiary of Samsung Electronics through Harman International Industries. The Connected Services Division supplies software services to the mobile communications industry. Harman has a workforce of approximately 30,000 people across the Americas, Europe, and Asia.

On January 22, 2015, Harman acquired Symphony Teleca from the Symphony Technology Group. The deal was valued at US$780 million. Symphony Telca was subsequently integrated and rebranded as Harman Connected Services and, in March 2017, Harman became a wholly owned subsidiary of Samsung Electronics.

== History ==
=== Early history ===
Teleca was founded in 1992 by a team of software engineers, based in Manchester. Over the coming years, Teleca's telecom software was utilized by Motorola, Racal, Digital, GEC, Hewlett-Packard, Psion, and Siemens. The presence in the market led to a number of major mobile device partnerships, which led them to expand their offering into the mobile phone market. These vendors included Nokia, Motorola and SonyEricsson.

In early 2000, it was acquired by Sigma AB, a leading Swedish engineering services business, and became its UK subsidiary. Following the takeover, Teleca expanded their workforce from 2,500 across Europe into a number of countries including Łódź, Poland and Seoul, South Korea.

Teleca then acquired Telma Soft in 2006, a Russian-based software company. Over the next two years, Teleca opened a number of different locations up in both India and China.

Symphony Technology Group announced in 2008 that they had acquired Teleca and delisted it from the Stockholm stock exchange. Later that year, Telma Soft was then rebranded to become the Russian Teleca operation.

In 2013, the company had 9000+ employees in 35 countries with the largest number of employees in India spread across many locations, including Bangalore, Pune, Gurgaon and Chennai.

=== Symphony ownership ===
Symphony services was founded in 2002 with initial financial support from Romesh T. Wadhwani, Chairman, CEO and founder of Symphony Technology Group. In 2003, Symphony raised growth capital from TH Lee Putnam Ventures. In 2004, Symphony Services purchased Stonehouse Technologies for $6.7 million.

In 2010, Symphony Services acquired Proteans Software Solutions, an Indian company engaged in providing software engineering services to the small and medium ISV space; followed by CoreObjects Software Inc, a Los Angeles–based company specializes in embedded product development for technology companies.

In 2011, Symphony Services acquired JPC Software, an Argentina entity that offers IT solutions, consulting and support services based in Buenos Aires.

In 2012, Symphony Services Corporation merged with Teleca, creating Symphony Teleca Corporation with a focus to help clients manage the global convergence of software, the cloud, and mobility. Following the purchase of Teleca, Symphony became Symphony Teleca and part of the Symphony Services division. The new services division focused on software product engineering outsourcing services and was headquartered in Palo Alto, California, with major global operations centers in the U.S., India and China. The company was assessed as CMMI level 3.

On 10 April 2014, Symphony Teleca announced that they would be acquiring Aditi Technologies for an undisclosed amount. Following the acquisition, Sanjay Dhawan took over as CEO and Pradeep Rathinam was appointed as Aditi's president. Aditi subsequently became an independent business unit of Symphony Teleca.

=== Harman Connected Services ===
In 2015, it was announced that Harman International Industries were interested in acquiring Symphony Teleca. Harman and Symphony Technology Group agreed on a deal worth US$780 million. Teleca was rebranded Harman Connected Services, with a focus on producing software for all Harman-related products.

As well as Symphony Teleca, Harman also acquired Red Bend Software. The total price for the acquisition was $200 million, with $170 million in shares and $30 million in cash once certain milestones were reached. The Red Bend software remote revision by cellular operators of both software and physical components installed in cellular devices and its software is used on more than 2 billion mobile phones globally. TowerSec was another company acquired by HARMAN in 2016. The Israel-based cyber security company focused on security for the automotive industry.

Collectively, the acquired companies were merged to form Harman Connected Services. Its parent company was acquired in 2016 for US$8 billion by Samsung Electronics.

== Global locations ==
| Geographies | Offices |
|---|---|
| Europe | Malmö (Sweden); Tampere, Oulu (Finland); Richmond, Reading (UK); Bochum, Nuremberg (Germany); Nizhny Novgorod (Russia); Łódź (Poland) |
| Americas | Buenos Aires (Argentina) |
| United States | Mountain View, San Diego, Farmington Hills, Nashville, Plano, Westford, Providence, Bellevue, Burlington |
| Asia | Seoul (Korea); Beijing, Chengdu (China); Pune, Gurgaon, Mumbai, Chennai, Bangalore (India); Tokyo (Japan) |

Teleca Chengdu

Teleca Espoo (Finland)

Teleca Oulu (Finland)

== Certifications ==
- ISO 9001:2008
