= Blue Rider (album) =

Studio album by Zachary Cale
- Released: September 24, 2013
- Genre: Rock
- Length: 34:51
- Label: Electric Ragtime

Zachary Cale chronology
Noise of Welcome (2011)	Blue Rider (2013)	Duskland (2015)

Professional ratings
Aggregate scores
Source	Rating
Metacritic	82/100
Review scores
Source	Rating
American Songwriter	3.5/4 stars
PopMatters	8/10 stars

Blue Rider is the fourth studio album by American musician Zachary Cale. It was released in September 2013 under Electric Ragtime Records & All Hands Electric in the US and JellyFant in Germany.

== Track listing ==
No.	Title	Length
1.	"Unfeeling"	4:07
2.	"Dollar Day"	3:19
3.	"Hold Fast"	4:13
4.	"Dear Shadow"	5:04
5.	"Blood Rushes On"	4:46
6.	"Hangman Letters"	3:29
7.	"Wayward Son"	4:58
8.	"Noise of Welcome"	4:55
