= Freddie Fu =

Hong Kong-American doctor, academic, and surgeon (1950–2021)

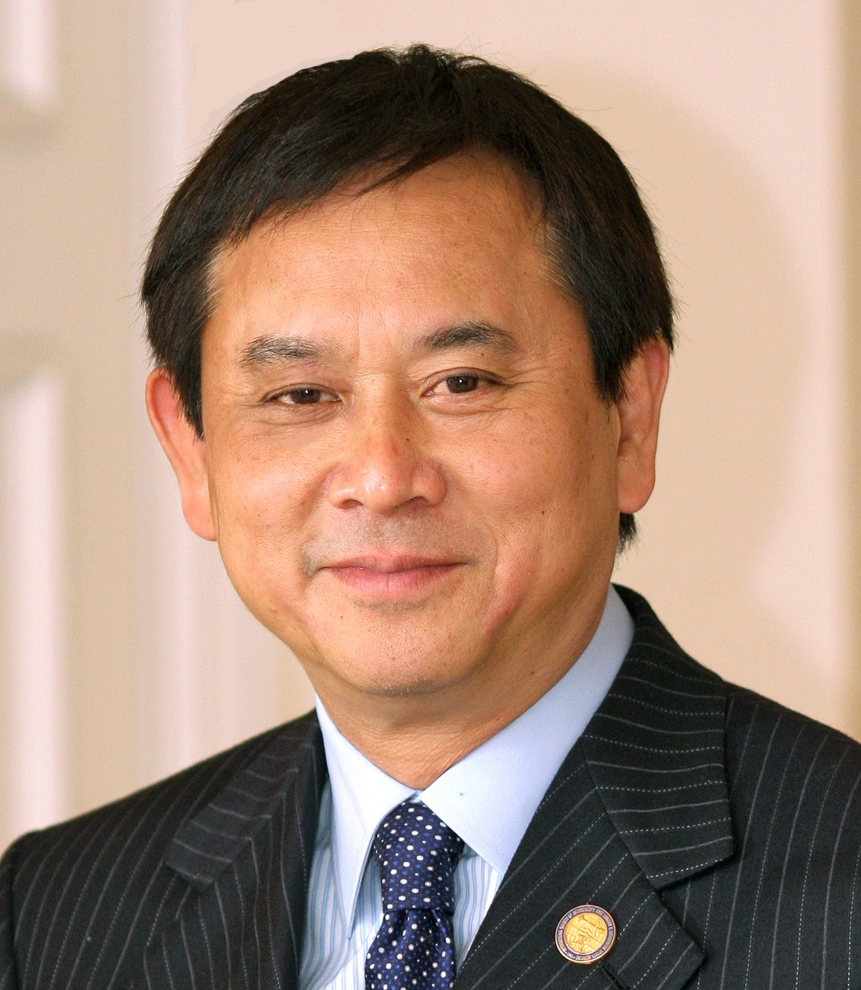
Freddie H. Fu

Freddie H. Fu (Chinese: 傅浩強; Jyutping: Fu6 Hou6-koeng4; (1950 – September 24, 2021) was a Hong Kongese-American doctor and academic. He was the David Silver Professor and chairman of the Department of Orthopaedic Surgery at the University of Pittsburgh School of Medicine. In 2010, he was appointed by the University of Pittsburgh as the eighth distinguished service professor. He died due to metastatic melanoma on 24 September 2021.

== Career ==
Fu was born in Hong Kong, his ancestral hometown is Nanhai district, Foshan city, Guangdong province. He attended Dartmouth College, where he was a member of the Alpha Chi Alpha fraternity. Dr. Fu was president of the Pennsylvania Orthopaedic Society and, in 2008, assumed the presidency of the American Orthopaedic Society for Sports Medicine (AOSSM) and was the first foreign-born president in AOSSM's 40-year history. In 2009, he was named president of the International Society of Arthroscopy, Knee Surgery and Orthopaedic Sports Medicine. In 2011, he received the American Academy of Orthopaedic Surgeons' (AAOS) Diversity Award. In 2012, Fu received the Sports Leadership Award from Dapper Dan Charities, which was subsequently renamed the Freddie Fu Sports Leadership Award and will remain in perpetuity.

== Pitt orthopaedic research ==
At the time of his death, his team had more than 100 studies completed or underway to evaluate the merits of the anatomic approach by viewing the knee as an organ. He also had ongoing collaborations with K. Christopher Beard, Ph.D., a vertebrate paleontologist, and other curators at the Carnegie Museum of Natural History and veterinarians at the Pittsburgh Zoo. Additionally, Fu worked closely with C. Owen Lovejoy, Ph.D., an anthropologist at Kent State University, who reconstructed the skeleton of “Lucy”, the nearly complete fossil of a human ancestor that walked upright more than three million years ago. Such collaborations allowed for detailed study of evolution and bony and soft tissue anatomy of the knee.
