= Bill Chisholm (businessman) =

American businessman

- Born: William F. Chisholm Jr.
- Education: Dartmouth College (BA); University of Pennsylvania (MBA)
- Occupations: Private equity fund partner, entrepreneur
- Title: Co-founder, managing partner, and chief investment officer of STG Partners, LLC
- Political party: Democratic
- Spouse: Kimberly Ford Chisholm
- Children: 3

William F. Chisholm Jr. is an American businessman. He is the managing partner and chief investment officer for STG Partners, LLC, a private equity firm, and has been the owner of the National Basketball Association (NBA)'s Boston Celtics since 2025. He purchased the Celtics for a record $6.1 billion.

== Early life ==
Chisholm grew up in Georgetown, Massachusetts. His father, William F. Chisholm Sr. (1929–2017), played a role in establishing the Georgetown High School soccer program, and his mother, Judy Chisholm, worked as an administrative assistant at Brooks School. Chisholm and his siblings attended Brooks School, where he played basketball, lacrosse, and soccer, and led the soccer team to its first ever Class A New England Prep championship. In his senior year, he won The Boston Globe's All-Scholastic award for soccer. He graduated from Brooks in 1987.

He went to Dartmouth College, where he played for the soccer team and was a member of Alpha Chi Alpha. He graduated from Dartmouth in 1991. He later received a Master of Business Administration (MBA) from the Wharton School at the University of Pennsylvania in 1996. He grew up a fan of the Boston Celtics and is reported to have an "encyclopedic knowledge" of the team.

== Career ==
After graduating from Dartmouth, Chisholm worked as an analyst for PaineWebber in New York. From January 1994 to August 1994, he served as chief financial officer of International Sports Publishing. From August 1996 to January 2000, he served as a management consultant at Bain & Company. In 1999, Chisholm was elected to the board of directors of FAFCO INC., a solar pool heating company that was headed by his father-in-law, Freeman A. Ford. The company ceased operations in 2024.

According to an SEC filing, Chisholm was a partner of the Valent Group, an early-stage venture firm, from January 2000 to January 2002. In February 2000, Romesh Wadhwani invited Chisholm to join Symphony Technology Group (Symphony), a venture capital firm, as a partner. In August 2001, Chisholm acquired a "less than 5%" ownership in Symphony. In July 2002, Chisholm through his living trust acquired "5% but less than 10%" ownership in Symphony. In 2017, Wadhwani retired as Symphony's CEO, and the firm was reconfigured as STG Partners, LLC.

STG Partners and Symphony are two different firms, yet maintain an inter-company agreement. In December 2017, Chisholm was named managing partner and chief investment officer (CIO) of STG Partners. As a managing partner, Chisholm, individually, acquired a "less than 5%" ownership in STG Partners. In 2021, he acquired a beneficial ownership, "50% but less than 75%", in STG Management Feeder, L.P., which owns "greater than 75%" of STG Management Holdings, which is the controlling entity of STG Partners. On March 28, 2025, STG Partners reported that it represented 19 clients in pooled investment vehicles totaling approximately $12 billion in assets under management, including SurveyMonkey and Onclusive, a slight increase from 2024. In addition, the SEC document noted that STG Partners maintains "less than one billion dollars" in total assets. As well, Chisholm and his living trust own less than 15% of Symphony, which has assets under management of approximately $341 million.

In March 2025, Chisholm led an investment group, including current Boston Celtics owner Wyc Grousbeck, Bruce A. Beal, Jr., Rob Hale, Sixth Street Partners, and others, to enter into a definitive agreement to purchase the Celtics for an initial valuation of $6.1 billion from Boston Basketball Partners. In 2024, the Celtics' annual revenue was $493 million. The proposed Celtics purchase price is the largest amount ever for a North American sports franchise.

The NBA league office must first review the agreement. After its review, Chisholm's proposal will be submitted to the NBA's Board of Governors for approval. The agreement calls for Chisholm and his investors to acquire at least 51% of the team. The remaining 49%, currently held by Grousbeck and his investors, some of whom are also part of Chisholm's group, would maintain the option to hold the remaining shares until 2028, where they may be sold for a higher valuation. Goldman Sachs, Jordan Park Group, JP Morgan, Mary Callahan Erdoes, and BDT & MSD Partners, whose co-CEO is Gregg Lemkau, Chisholm's Dartmouth classmate and soccer teammate, assisted in financing the Celtics deal.

In May 2025, Indian business heir and the CEO of ArcelorMittal, Aditya Mittal invested $1 billion into Chisholm’s purchase of the Celtics, giving the former a significant stake in the team.

NBA investment rules dictate that a lead owner or "control person" must raise cash, not debt, and must possess at least a 15% financial interest in the team. In addition, according to the league's private equity ownership rules, Chisholm's ownership percentage must be greater than a private equity fund, such as Sixth Street Partners. As the control person, Chisholm must purchase more than a $1 billion stake in the Celtics; approximately $500 million is due when the deal closes, and the remainder balance within three years of the purchase date.

It is not clear how much money Chisholm has or has to invest in the proposed $6.1 billion Celtics purchase. Although a Forbes article calculates his current net worth as greater than $1 billion, he is not included on either the Bloomberg Billionaires Index or Forbes Billionaires list.

== Personal life ==
A California resident, Chisholm is married to Kimberly Ford Chisholm, whom he met as an undergraduate at Dartmouth. His wife is the great-granddaughter of Gutzon Borglum. Three generations of his and her families have attended Dartmouth. His father-in-law, Freeman Ford, is a Dartmouth alumnus. The couple have three children, who are all Dartmouth alumni. The Chisholms own a home on the border of the Dartmouth campus in Hanover, New Hampshire.

In 2013, Chisholm required heart surgery.

=== Philanthropy ===
The Chisholms have been active supporters of Breakthrough T1D (formerly Juvenile Diabetes Foundation). In 2016, they were honored with the Breakthrough T1D Impact Award for their contributions to curing, preventing, and treating Type 1 diabetes. In 2020, they were recognized as lifetime members of the JDRF One Society, which recognizes donor who have pledged and/or donated more than one million dollars to Breakthrough T1D.

=== Politics ===
In 2020, Chisholm donated to California Democratic Congressman Josh Harder.

Sporting positions
Preceded by Wyc Grousbeck	Boston Celtics principal owner 2025–present Served alongside: Aditya Mittal	Incumbent
