= Sentrigo =

- Type: Division
- Industry: Software & Programming
- Founded: 2006
- Defunct: 2011
- Fate: Acquired by McAfee
- Headquarters: Santa Clara, California, USA
- Key people: Nathan Shuchami, co-founder & CEO; Slavik Markovich, co-founder & CTO
- Products: Hedgehog; DBscanner; vPatch; IDentifier; FuzzOr
- Revenue: Not reported
- Number of employees: 45
- Website: http://www.sentrigo.com/

Sentrigo was a privately held software company located in Santa Clara, California, USA, until its acquisition in April, 2011 by McAfee.

The company was founded in 2006 by Nathan Shuchami and Slavik Markovich, to address several key challenges in Database security. Specifically, the inability to monitor activity of privileged users and those who have established such credentials through nefarious means, and the difficulty in maintaining a DBMS at the most current patch level. The company's products have expanded to include a broader suite of database security offerings, including database audit and vulnerability assessment as well.

Investors in Sentrigo included: Benchmark Capital, Stata Ventures and Juniper Networks.
