= Duskland =

Studio album by Zachary Cale
- Released: August 7, 2015
- Genre: Rock
- Length: 39:30
- Label: No Quarter

Zachary Cale chronology
Blue Rider (2013)	Duskland (2015)

Professional ratings
Aggregate scores
Source	Rating
Metacritic	72/100
Review scores
Source	Rating
PopMatters	(8/10)

Duskland is a studio album by American musician Zachary Cale. It was released in August 2015 under No Quarter Records.

== Track list ==
No.	Title	Length
1.	"Sundowner"	3:49
2.	"Blue Moth"	5:19
3.	"I Left the Old Cell"	4:08
4.	"Evensong"	4:54
5.	"Basilica"	2:11
6.	"Dark Wings"	3:54
7.	"I Forged the Bullet"	3:29
8.	"Changing Horses"	4:25
9.	"Low Light Serenade"	7:21
