= Magic Solutions =

American software company

Magic Solutions, Inc.
- Type: Private
- Industry: Computer software
- Founded: 1988; 38 years ago
- Defunct: 1998
- Headquarters: Paramus, New Jersey, U.S.
- Key people: Igal Lichtman, Founder & CEO; Raphael Houri, CTO; Andrew Rawson, VP Marketing; Michael Pallatta, VP Sales, Vadim Mostov, Chief Architect; Efim Gendler, Head of Search Technology; Jon Von Lintig, CFO; Florence Schlanger, VP Client Service; Barbara Johnson, VP International; Uri Weis, Head of Implementation
- Products: SupportMagic
- Website: BMC Software

Magic Solutions International, Inc. (known as Magic Solutions) was a company that specialized in help desk automation and asset management software. Based in the East Coast of the United States, the company emerged as an unplanned spin-off from a computer systems integrator, and was later considered one of the East Coast's most successful independent software vendors of the 1990s. Magic Solutions was founded in 1988 by Igal Lichtman and was headquartered in Paramus, New Jersey, U.S.

At inception, the company consisted of a single programmer in the service of one customer. Magic Solutions eventually accommodated over 300 staff members and a customer base of 6,000. The company reached a yearly revenue sum of US$64 million and in 1998 was sold to Network Associates, Inc. (now known as McAfee) for US$110 million in cash.

== Early history ==
MicroAge, of Mahwah, New Jersey, was a retail computer franchise in the 1980s that achieved a considerable level of success. It transitioned from a retailer of stand-alone computers into a value added reseller and offered LAN installations for local businesses. A significant problem faced by the company after formation was the management of equipment that was sold and returned for service. At the time, a PC-based tracking program that could monitor serial numbers, warranty entitlement and a complete service history did not exist. Igal Lichtman, president of MicroAge, and one of the three owners, designed a "workflow" for a service management program that enabled staff to effectively run the company's service department. Employing the "C" programming language, and working together with former colleagues and friends from the Israel Defense Forces, Lichtman created the application, "ServiceMagic".

Shortly after the creation of ServiceMagic, one of MicroAge's largest clients, a "Fortune 500" company based in Westchester County, New York, U.S., was discarding its mainframe computer and consequently required a help desk application that was compatible with a PC network. Lichtman worked with the client's Information technology (IT) department to modify ServiceMagic and designed a new product, "SupportMagic". The client installed the fledgling Btrieve-based software and successfully transitioned from a Computer Associates mainframe-based Netman. Following a magazine article on the development of SupportMagic, Lichtman received over one hundred telephone inquires for the software product, an increase in demand that led to the inception of Magic Solutions.

== Growth ==
Following the creation of Magic Solutions, Lichtman devoted the entirety of his time to the initiative's development. Vadim Mostov, a Russian programmer who was reputable at the time, was employed by the founder in addition to a sales team. Among the first selection of sales employees were Mike Pallatta, a recent Stevens Institute of Technology (Stevens) electrical engineering (EE) graduate, and Andrew Rawson, a former MicroAge customer. During the company's initial growth period, Pallatta became the "vice president (VP) of Sales" and Rawson was promoted into the position of "VP of Marketing". Following promotion, Pallatta built a telemarketing sales force that prioritized the minimization of overheads for his department. Pallata and Rawson collaborated to develop a series of "over-the-phone" sales tools that finalized deals in the US$50,000 range without the need for a "face-to-face" sales engagement.

While the sales capacity of the company was growing, Lichtman closely monitored product development, based upon a belief that the customer base should determine product direction. As the sales and marketing areas of Magic Solutions flourished, Lichtman did not direct any of the company's budget towards advertising; instead, Rawson worked with the internal public relations (PR) staff to conceive of, and then manage, a press editorial calendar, as well as ensuring that company representatives attended trade show exhibitions. The company also developed an international series of sales seminars, and numerous support professionals from the U.S., Canada, and the European Union (EU) were in attendance during the delivery of the series.

With the inaugural management team successfully established, Lichtman focused on expanding the capabilities of the company's products. The development cycle was brief, as, in accordance with the founder's client-focused principle, new features and functionality were directed by user feedback. Pallatta then built a sixty-person direct sales team and commenced a European distribution channel, with Rawson constructing the infrastructure to support Pallatta's new recruits. Pallatta also became a board member and was responsible for the daily business operations of Magic Solutions. Rawson was Magic Solutions' public representative, a role that primarily involved conference presentations, and consultancy for the press and industry analysts. In its fourth year, Magic Solutions had registered nearly US$6 million in "book" revenue (also known as "unrealized" revenue) with a continually growing customer base, and SupportMagic had received positive press coverage.

Under Rawson, the marketing team expanded to over 35 staff members, and Magic Solutions gained a reputation as the dominant help desk software provider and "thought leader" in the internal IT help desk market. Magic Solutions' primary marketing activity at the time was the presentation of the company's promotional display at trade shows. The Magic Solutions trade show display usually consisted of a space shuttle replica that housed a complete, interactive support center, alongside an animatronic bunny (Magic Solutions' mascot), with both "flying" above the show floor—the company spent more than US$250,000 on the display for each trade show event. Occasionally, additions to the original concept, such as the display of life-size photographs of company personnel, were included.

In September 1997, the company purchased WINsales, Inc., a sales force automation software company that was based in Seattle, Washington, U.S. The acquisition provided the company with a foothold in the rapidly expanding customer relationship management market and followed the opening of new Magic Solutions offices in Chicago, U.S.; San Jose, U.S.; Toronto, Ontario, Canada; London, U.K.; Frankfurt, Germany; Munich, Germany; Amsterdam, Netherlands; and Brussels, Belgium. Lichtman added Florence Schlanger as the VP of Client Services and Jon Von Lintig as chief financial officer (CFO). The previous year, Lichtman had hired an ex-Israeli Army friend Efim Gendler as an additional programmer to begin work on a proprietary search engine. Named for its searching style, "Statistical Information Retrieval (SIR)" was similar to early Internet search engines and the technology was eventually licensed to Microsoft for use with its CD-based TechNet knowledge base. Magic Solutions also signed other cross-licensing deals, such as a cross-licensing agreement with Intel to embed its Wake-on-LAN (WOL) and inventory discovery tools; a deal to embed Ziff Davis' "Support On Site" content into what became the "SupportMagic Platform"; and an agreement that utilized ServiceWare's "Knowledge-Paks" to form "RightAnswers, Inc."

== International expansion ==
While Pallatta focused on domestic sales, Magic Solutions' international sales were bolstered by its VP in the international arena Barbara Johnson who continued the company's expansion with European, Asian and Latin American distributors. By late-1997, these international accounts represented almost forty percent of Magic Solutions' sales. The company's overseas expansion included a key acquisition in 1996 of SupportMagic Benelux—managed by Cornelis Mudde and Guido Vervelde—Magic Solutions' largest distributor at the time. In late 1996, Magic Solutions released the Kanji version of SupportMagic, a product that was distributed in Japan by Transcosmos.

During the course of its growth, Magic Solutions avoided venture capital and retained its original management team.

== IPO ==
By 1996, Magic Solutions was competing in a marketplace that was beginning to consolidate. The company faced competitors that were bundling help desk software with their other products, as McAfee did with its anti-virus product, and management was considering either an initial public offering (IPO) or venture capital to fuel further growth. Until this point in time Lichtman had maintained Magic Solutions' independence as a company, but he was forced to make choices about the company's future from a limited set of options.

By 1997 Wall Street brokers were actively pursuing Magic Solutions for a public offering and Lichtman then employed the services of a well-known pre-IPO executive to preside over the preparation process. By this stage, Network Associates, Inc. (NYSE:NETA, now McAfee) had entered the help desk market through the 1995 acquisition of two small companies, Vycor and PHD Help Desk. Unsuccessful in its challenge against the two market leaders Magic Solutions and Remedy, Network Associates entered into acquisition discussions with Magic Solutions.

== Acquisition ==
On March 25, 1998 Network Associates announced its plan to close a transaction whereby it would acquire Magic Solutions for approximately US$90 million for the purchase of in-process research and development. Network Associates then sold Magic Solutions' assets to BMC Software (NYSE:BMC) on December 15, 2003 for an approximate cash sum of US$47 million; the official date of the acquisition was February 2, 2004.

== Awards ==
- New Jersey Tech Council: Marketing Company of the Year – 1997
- Ernst & Young: Entrepreneur of the Year for Software Development in New Jersey (awarded to Igal Lichtman) – 1996
- United States Chamber of Commerce: Blue Chip Enterprise Company of the Year – 1995
- Deloitte and Touche: FAST 50 – 1995.
- INC 500 – 1995 & 1996
