= Network Security Platform =

The Trellix Network Security Platform, originally Mcafee IntruShield, is a network-based intrusion prevention sensor appliance that is used in prevention of zero-day, DoS (Denial of Service) attacks, spyware, malware, botnets and VoIP threats.

Sensor hardware components	I-4010	I-4000	I-3000	I-2700	I-1400	I-1200
Performance	Up to 2 Gbit/s	Up to 2 Gbit/s	Up to 1 Gbit/s	Up to 600 Mbit/s	Up to 200 Mbit/s	Up to 100 Mbit/s
Dedicated Gigabit Ports	12	4	12	2	n/a	n/a
Dedicated Fast Ethernet Ports	n/a	n/a	n/a	6	4	2
Dedicated Fast Ethernet Response Ports	2	2	2	3	1	1
