= Jakarta Intercultural School =

Private international school in Indonesia

Location
- Jl. Terogong Raya #33; South Jakarta, 12430; Indonesia

Information
- School type: Private international school
- Established: 1951
- Head of school: Maya Nelson
- Grades: Early Childhood through Grade 12
- Gender: Coeducational
- Enrollment: 2,474 students at the beginning of the 2009–10 school year
- Language: English
- Campuses: Pattimura Elementary (PEL), Pondok Indah Elementary (PIE), Cilandak
- Campus size: 46 acres (190,000 m^{2})
- Colours: Blue and white
- Mascot: Dragon
- Accreditation: Western Association of Schools and Colleges, Council of International Schools
- School fees: US$35,000
- Website: jisedu.or.id

Jakarta Intercultural School (JIS), formerly Jakarta International School, is a private, international school in Jakarta, Indonesia. It was established in 1951 for expatriate students living in Jakarta and is the largest international primary and secondary school in Indonesia. JIS has more than 2,500 students aged 3 to 18 from over 70 nationalities. The school adheres to an American curriculum while taking pieces from other curriculum models from pre-kindergarten through grade 12. It is accredited by the Western Association of Schools and Colleges and the Council of International Schools. Since JIS is an American Overseas School, it is assisted by the US Department of State's Office of Overseas Schools. JIS has three campuses, two solely for elementary students in Pattimura and Pondok Indah, and one much bigger and considered the main campus for junior high and high school students in Cilandak, South Jakarta.

The school changed its name to Jakarta Intercultural School from Jakarta International School in 2014 to comply with the Indonesian government's regulations on prohibiting the use of the word "international" in school names.

== History ==
Jakarta Intercultural School was established in 1951, as a school for the children of United Nations staff posted in Jakarta, the capital of the then newly Dutch recognized independent Indonesia. Due to an increased international presence in Jakarta, the school moved into newer facilities at its Pattimura campus in 1953. In 1969, the school became the "Joint Embassy School" under the sponsorship of the Australian, British, Yugoslavian, and United States Embassies. Architectural and engineering practice International Design Consultants (IDC) was commissioned to build additional facilities for the school. The new campus was built in Cilandak, a residential area in South Jakarta. The Cilandak campus was completed in 1977 and serves as the middle school and high school. The school adopted the name "Jakarta International School" in 1978 and changed its name to "Jakarta Intercultural School" in 2014.

== Facilities ==
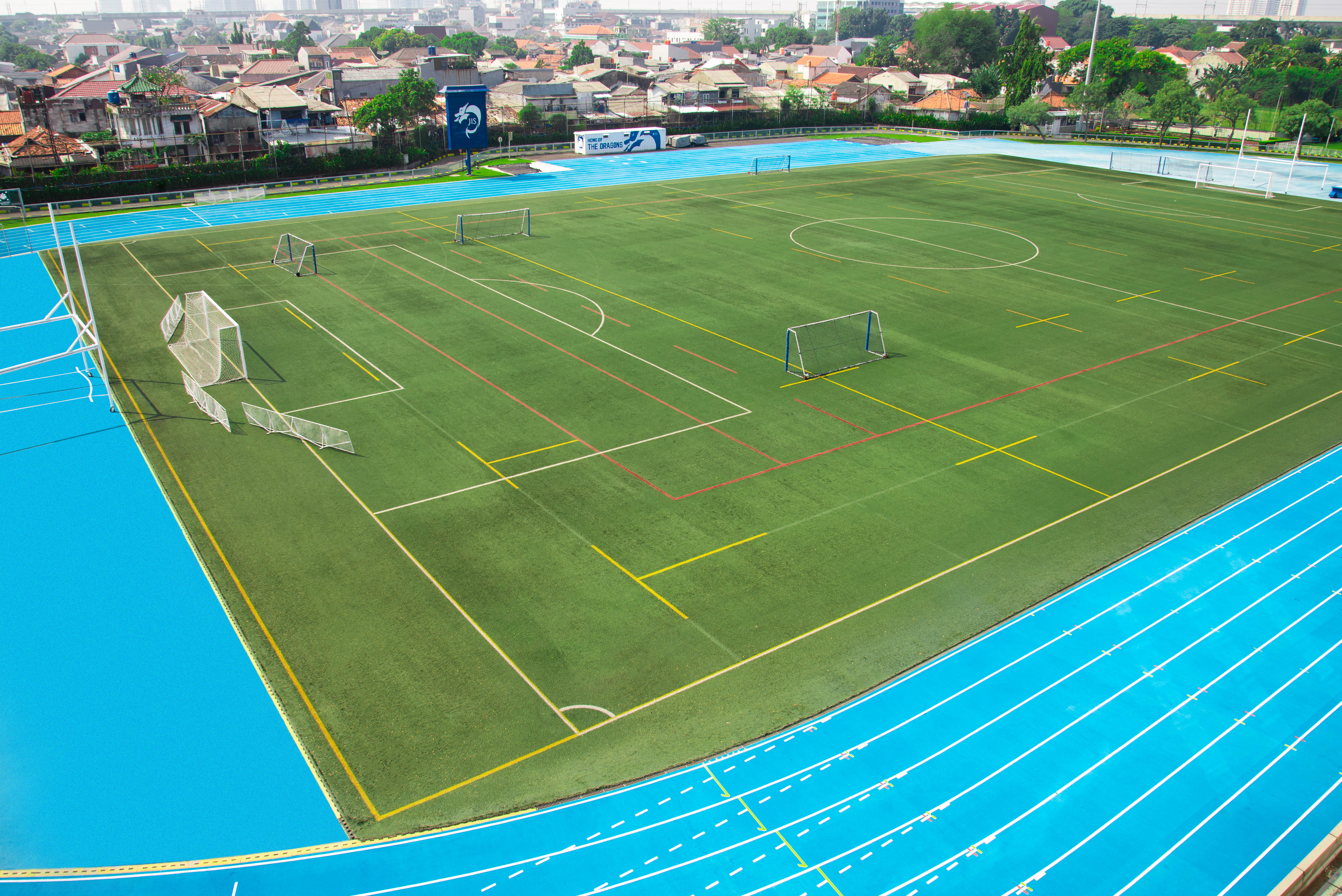

Jakarta Intercultural School has three campuses totaling 46 acres (190,000 m^{2}) and is one of the largest international schools in the world according to H2L2 Architecture. Pattimura Elementary (K-5) is located in the Kebayoran Baru area. Pondok Indah Elementary (K-5) and Cilandak (6–12) are adjacent to each other in Pondok Indah, South Jakarta.

Facilities are mostly air-conditioned and include 184 classrooms, four theaters, three cafeterias, three tennis courts, six gymnasiums, six playing fields, three swimming pools, 18 science laboratories, design technology facilities, and four libraries with a total of 130,000 volumes. The school has a three-level food court, medical clinic, a school bus system run by the Bluebird company and an ambulance. In addition, as of 2024-25 academic year, a new Cafe under the name "Kumpul" has been added to the campus.

== Administration ==
Jakarta Intercultural School is an Indonesian foundation (yayasan) overseen by a board of governors and a school council, that functions like a school board or board of education. The School Council is an eleven-member Board of Patrons; nine elected, four of whom are elected by the parents and three appointed by the Founding Embassies. They, in turn, appoint four other members, one of whom must be an Indonesian citizen.

== Enrollment ==
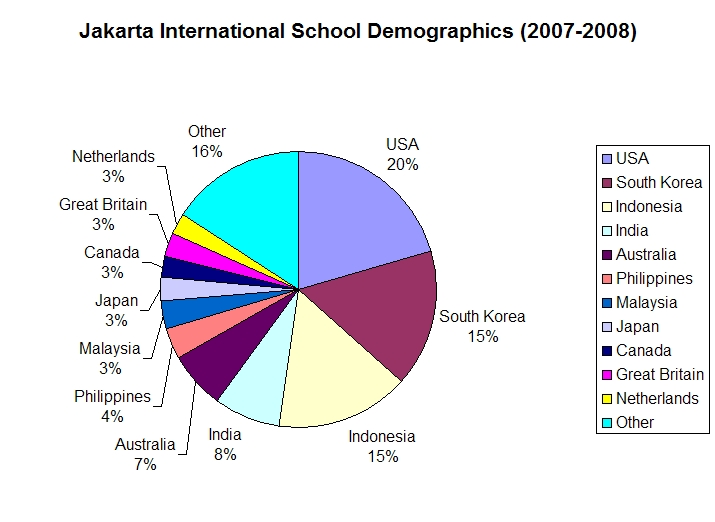
Nationality of JIS students by percentage (2007–2008)

Jakarta Intercultural School is the largest international primary and secondary school in Indonesia, enrolling 2,527 students from 72 nationalities during the 2007–2008 school year. The five most commonly represented nationalities were the United States, Republic of Korea, Indonesia, India, and Australia.

== Secondary education ==
Jakarta Intercultural School offers education from early years (age 3) through grade 12. Students undertake the JIS Diploma, and can choose to complete an International Baccalaureate Diploma or an International Advanced Placement Diploma (APID). Students may also take individual IB or Advanced Placement courses without pursuing the full diploma program. Over 99 percent of graduating seniors go on to a university or college. The JIS diploma focuses on an American-style curriculum. For the 2024 graduating class, the universities that JIS students were mostly accepted into included Boston University, the University of Toronto, and the University of British Columbia.

== Co-curricular activities ==
Students are known in athletic competition as the 'Jakarta Dragons'.

Middle and high school level students at Jakarta Intercultural School compete in intramural and interscholastic sports throughout the year. Jakarta Intercultural School belongs to the Interscholastic Association of Southeast Asian Schools (IASAS) which competes with six international schools in Southeast Asia. IASAS schools alternate hosting each other for tournaments, exchanges, conventions and competitions. Three IASAS seasons per year frame the HS sports and cultural competition calendar.

IASAS Sports: Boys and Girls Varsity and Junior Varsity sports teams follow the IASAS season schedule at JIS each year.

- Season One: Cross-country, Volleyball, Soccer
- Season Two: Basketball, Rugby/Touch, Swimming, Tennis
- Season Three: Track and Field, Badminton, Softball/Baseball, Golf

Cultural Convention: Held in March, JIS participates in IASAS Cultural Convention, which includes three separate components: "Art and Music", "Dance and Drama", and "Debate and Forensics".

Model United Nations: JIS participates in the non-competitive IASAS Model United Nations, and holds an annual General Assembly.

IASAS Math: JIS participates in the IASAS Math program.

IASAS Chess: JIS has participated from the start of the IASAS Chess Competition.

TEDxJIS Conferences: TEDxJIS suite of conferences are independently organized TED events dedicated to Jakarta Intercultural School's ideas worth spreading, operating under license from TED Conferences LLC. It includes the annual TEDxJIS conference, TEDxYouth@JIS, TEDxJISLive, TEDxJISWomen, and TEDxJISSalon.

Cilandak Games: An annual competition amongst the high school students hosted on campus, where teams correspond to grade level. Each grade competes in various in-person and online activities such as Jenga Challenge, Escape Room, Among Us, Amazing Race, Banner Painting, Basketball, Jeopardy, Minute-To-Win-It, and Tug of War.

== JIS Peduli and Letters from Aceh ==
Following the 2004 Indian Ocean earthquake and tsunami, JIS started a campaign called JIS Peduli to raise money for schools affected by the disaster. The campaign included Letters from Aceh, a collection of letters and photographs exchanged between the children of the tsunami affected Indonesian province of Aceh, students from JIS, and schools worldwide. The collection has a foreword by Indonesian President Susilo Bambang Yudhoyono and proceeds were donated to a school-rebuilding program. The funds raised by JIS Peduli went towards a new community high school on the campus of Syiah Kuala University in Banda Aceh.

== Threats and security ==
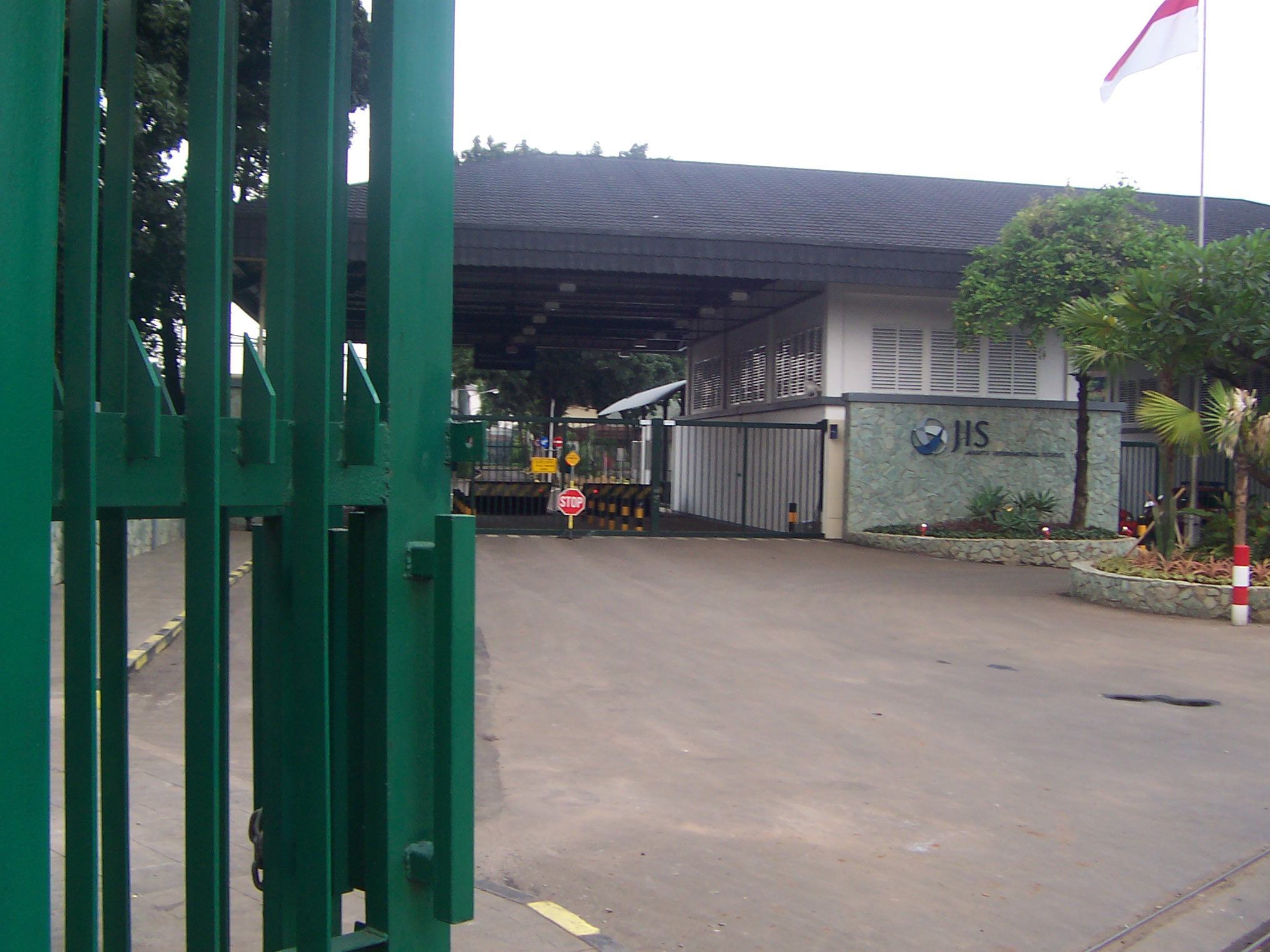
A security gate at JIS

Since its founding, Jakarta Intercultural School has been affected by the political and economic turbulence of Jakarta, receiving both direct and indirect threats to its security. During the 1960s, an attempted coup d'état by, allegedly, the Communist Party of Indonesia forced the evacuation of the school. In 1998, the school year ended early due to riots leading up to President Suharto's resignation, during which time most expatriate families were evacuated from the country.

JIS has also been a potential target for terrorism. Following the 2002 Bali bombings (to which a JIS mathematics teacher, Jamie Wellington, fell victim while on holiday), JIS and other international schools in Jakarta closed for several weeks after warnings of a possible terror attack. JIS was also on the target list of the terrorist group responsible for the 2003 Marriott Hotel bombing, which killed 13 people.

In response to these threats, JIS has made security upgrades. In 2002, the school added a three-meter-high "blast wall," a "boom gate" in front of the school, and protective security film over exterior windows. According to the head of the Australian International School in Jakarta, JIS received $2 million in US government security assistance in 2004. By 2005, the school had installed a security fence, with guards checking cars before they enter the premises.

From May 2005 to June 2008, counterterrorism officials stated their belief that the threat of a terrorist attack in Jakarta had diminished, although authorities continued to stress the need for vigilance.

== Criminal Case ==
In April 2014, a mother reported that her six-year-old child had been repeatedly raped by the school's ISS cleaning staff when he visited the school toilet. Police investigation later found two staff members of JIS Neil Bantleman and Ferdinand Tjong were involved in this case and there were two additional victims. At the beginning, the case was considered by some to be flawed with critics called it "malicious prosecution" or "investigation with evil purpose"

The two teachers were detained in July 2014 having been charged with the rape of three pre-school boys at the school. Despite these allegations, the school, its students, and their parents have voiced their support for the accused. Several cleaners who previously admitted to the charges recanted, claiming that police had used physical violence to make them confess. One of the suspects lost his life after drinking cleaning liquid during his custody in the police station.

In April 2015, the two former teachers received prison sentences of ten years each. Meanwhile, in August 2015, the civil suit against the school filed in the South Jakarta District Court was thrown out. Several foreign governments and expatriates in Jakarta believe the teachers' prosecutions were invalid. In August 2015, the two teachers were subsequently freed from jail after a successful appeal.

In February 2016, the Supreme Court overturned the acquittal of the two teachers and reinstated their imprisonment. Justice Artidjo Alkostar, who also led the Criminal Chamber of the Supreme Court, made the decision after the case was reviewed and found the former teachers did sexually assault the children. In addition, Justice Artidjo increased the prison sentence for both former teachers to 11 years. The Child Protection Commission (KPAI) praised the Supreme Court's decision. Bantleman later asked for a review from the court, but it was unsuccessful.

In July 2019, Neil Bantleman was granted clemency by President Joko Widodo for humanitarian reason and subsequently returned home to Canada. The decision prompted protests from the parents of the children as well as KPAI which called it a bad precedent for children's protection. KPAI also dismayed that the clemency was only publicly revealed after Bantleman already flew home to Canada, and the organization did not have a chance to take action. Ferdinand Tjong and other former cleaning workers did not receive clemency.

== Notable alumni ==
Business
- Kevin Aluwi – co-founder and co-CEO of Gojek
- Aditya Mittal – CEO of ArcelorMittal
- Patrick Grove – internet and media entrepreneur
Politics and Government
- Tammy Duckworth – senator for Illinois, the first disabled woman to be elected to the U.S. House of Representatives and Iraq War veteran
- Pramila Jayapal – member of the U.S. House of Representatives
- Chiara Porro – Australian Ambassador to the Holy See
- Linda Reynolds – defence minister of Australia and senator for Western Australia
- Dyah Roro Esti Widya Putri - Vice Minister of Trade of the Republic of Indonesia
- Susheela Jayapal – county commissioner for Multnomah County, Oregon
- Satya Hangga Yudha Widya Putra - First Level Official at the Ministry of Energy and Mineral Resources.
Arts and Entertainment
- Angela Kinsey – American actress best known for playing Angela Martin in the US version of The Office
- Cinta Laura – Indonesian-German actress, singer and model
- Jenny Kim - Beauty Queen, Miss Universe Korea 2016 and Miss Supranational 2017
- Michelle Victoria Alriani - Beauty Queen, Miss Earth Indonesia 2017
- Roger Mathey – director, producer, playwright and actor
- Joe Farnsworth – professional jazz musician
- Ryan Johnson – visual artist
Sport
- Milly Clark – Australian Olympic marathon runner
- Arthur Irawan – Indonesian footballer
- Erin McLeod – Olympic medalist, the professional goalkeeper for the Canadian national women's team and Orlando Pride
Journalism
- Atika Shubert – CNN foreign correspondent and news anchor
- Karishma Vaswani – Asia business correspondent for the BBC
- Erin Molan – Australian journalist and television personality
- Sebastian Modak – 2019 52 Places Traveler for the New York Times
Academia
- Vijay Balasubramanian – theoretical physicist (string theorist) and computational neuroscientist at the University of Pennsylvania
- James Mahmud Rice – sociologist and winner of the 2009 Stein Rokkan Prize for Comparative Social Science Research
- Maya Soetoro-Ng – teacher and maternal half-sister of Barack Obama
