= Alpha Chi Rho =

American collegiate fraternity

- ΑΧΡ
- Founded: June 4, 1895; 130 years ago Trinity College
- Type: Social
- Affiliation: NIC
- Status: Active
- Scope: National
- Motto: ΑΝΔΡΙΖΕΣΘΕ "Be Men"
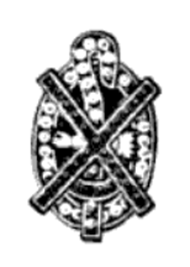
- Member badge
- Colors: Garnet and White
- Symbol: The Labarum
- Flag
- Publication: Garnet & White
- Chapters: 30 active
- Colonies: 4
- Nickname: Crows, Crow
- Headquarters: R.B. Stewart National Headquarters; 109 Oxford Way; Neptune, New Jersey 07753; United States
- Website: www.alphachirho.org

Alpha Chi Rho (ΑΧΡ), commonly known as Crows, Crow, or AXP, is an American men's collegiate fraternity founded on June 4, 1895, at Trinity College in Hartford, Connecticut, by the Reverend Paul Ziegler, his son Carl Ziegler, and Carl's friends William H. Rouse, Herbert T. Sherriff and Rev. William A.D. Eardeley. The fraternity was a charter member of the North American Interfraternity Conference. Its national headquarters is R.B. Stewart National Headquarters, located in Neptune, New Jersey.

== History ==
Alpha Chi Rho was founded on June 4, 1895, at Trinity College in Hartford, Connecticut, by the Reverend Paul Ziegler, his son Carl Ziegler, and Carl's friends William H. Rouse, Herbert T. Sherriff and Rev. William A.D. Eardeley. Collectively, these men are known as the Reverend Fathers of Apha Chi Rho:

- Paul Ziegler, Trinity 1872 – He was Phi Beta Kappa and valedictorian of his class, and a member of the Beta Beta society as a student. He composed the fraternity's landmarks and rituals, designed the fraternity's badge, and was the original author of the Exoteric Manual. He devoted his life to the ministry. All four of his sons were in Alpha Chi Rho and ministers of the Episcopal Church.
- Carl Ziegler, Trinity 1897 – He was a member of Phi Beta Kappa and the oldest son of founder Paul Ziegler. He was a lifelong Episcopal clergyman, also serving as the fraternity's National Chaplain for many years.
- William H. Rouse, Trinity 1896 – He was the first president of Phi Psi chapter. He was a teacher by profession who spent the later years of his life in Florida teaching English to Cuban and South American immigrants.
- Herbert T. Sherriff, Trinity 1897 – He attended high school and college with Carl G. Ziegler. He wrote the first installment of the fraternity's history. He had a career in public health in Portland, Oregon.
- William A.D. Eardeley, Trinity 1897 – He was the first National President of the fraternity and designed its coat of arms. He helped form Phi Chi and Phi Phi chapters. He started his career as an Episcopal minister and later became a noted genealogist.

The fraternity was a charter member of the North American Interfraternity Conference. Its national headquarters is R.B. Stewart National Headquarters, located in Neptune, New Jersey.

== Symbols ==
The symbol of the fraternity is the labarum and men of Alpha Chi Rho are commonly called "Crows." Its colors are garnet and white. Its motto is "Be Men". Its publication is Garnet & White.

== See also ==
- List of social fraternities
