= Gerald Boundy =

English cricketer

Personal information
- Full name: Gerald Oscar Boundy
- Born: 17 July 1895; Great Torrington, Devon, England
- Died: 8 February 1964 (aged 68); Hammersmith, London, England
- Batting: Right-handed

Domestic team information
- Years: Team
- 1926–1930: Somerset
- First-class debut: 22 May 1926 Somerset v Gloucestershire
- Last First-class: 4 June 1930 Somerset v Oxford University

Career statistics
Competition	First-class
Matches	2
Runs scored	22
Batting average	7.33
100s/50s	0/0
Top score	10*
Catches/stumpings	1/–
- Source: CricketArchive, 12 June 2014

Gerald Oscar Boundy, born at Great Torrington, Devon, England, on 17 July 1895 and died at the Royal Masonic Hospital, Hammersmith, London on 8 February 1964, played two first-class matches as a cricketer for Somerset in 1926 and 1930.

A right-handed batsman, Boundy batted in the middle order in both of his first-class games, the first being the Whitsun game against Gloucestershire at the County Ground, Taunton in 1926, and the other the away fixture with Cambridge University at Fenner's in 1930. In none of his four first-class innings did he make much impact and his top score of 10 not out was made against occasional bowlers in his last first-class innings.

Boundy was an accountant by profession and a long-standing member of Somerset County Cricket Club committees. He scored many runs in club cricket for Taunton Cricket Club, including more than 1,000 in the 1929 season alone.
