= Ryan Johnson (artist) =

American artist (born 1978)

- Ryan Johnson in 2026. Photo by Jason Schmidt.
- Born: 1978 (age 47–48); Karachi, Pakistan
- Known for: Sculpture
- Spouse: Dana Schutz
- Website: https://ryanjohnsonstudio.com/

Ryan Johnson (born 1978) is a visual artist based in Brooklyn, New York. His sculptures incorporate a range of materials from wood to casting tape to metal and have been described as having "spatial compressions, surreal displacements and quasi-Futurist illusions of movement." Johnson's work has appeared in exhibitions at MoMA PS1, Casino Luxembourg - Forum d'Art Contemporain, The Contemporary Museum, Honolulu Museum of Art Spalding House, the Saatchi Gallery and others.

Johnson grew up in Jakarta, Indonesia, and graduated from Jakarta International School. He holds a BFA from Pratt Institute and an MFA from Columbia University.

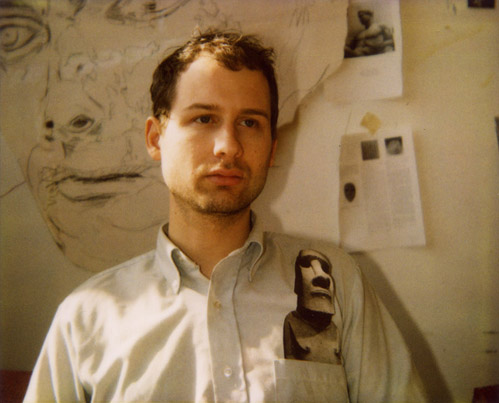
Ryan Johnson in 2009.

== Selected solo exhibitions ==
- Life Study, Nicelle Beauchene Gallery, New York, NY, 2017
- Self Storage, Suzanne Geiss Company, New York, NY, 2012
- Description of a Struggle, Sikkema Jenkins and Co., New York, NY, 2010
- Watchman, Guild & Greyshkul, New York, NY, 2008
- Ambien Eyes, Franco Soffiantino Arte Contemporanea, Turin, Italy, 2007
- Modern Human Animal, LFL Gallery, New York, NY, 2005

== Selected group exhibitions ==
- 2018 Visitors from Shallow Space, Fresh Window, Brooklyn, NY
- 2017 Cupid Angling, John H. Baker Gallery, West Chester University, West Chester, PA
- 2016 Fort Greene, curated by Adrianne Rubenstein, Venus LA, Los Angeles, CA
- Life Study, EDDYSROOM, Greenpoint, NY
- 2015 Under Foundations, curated by Jess Wilcox, Sculpture Center, Long Island City, NY
- Eagles II, Galeria Marlborough, Madrid, Spain
- 2014 Forever, Metropolitan Art Society, Beirut, Lebanon
- Imaginary Portraits, curated by Dodie Kazanjian, Gallery Met, New York, NY
- Pale Fire, Leroy Neiman Gallery, Columbia University, New York, NY
- 2013 High, Low, and In Between, with Ryan Johnson, Johannes VanDerBeek, and Sara VanDerBeek, White Flag Projects, St. Louis, MO
- 2012 Pewter Wings, Golden Horns, Stone Veils, GRIMM Gallery, The Netherlands
- 2010 NeoIntegrity: Comics Edition, Museum of Comics and Cartoon Art, New York, NY
- 2009 Abstract America: New Painting and Sculpture, Saatchi Gallery, London, UK
- On From Here, Guild & Greyshkul, New York, NY
- 2008 Without Walls, Museum 52, New York, NY
- Imaginary Thing, curated by Peter Eleey, Aspen Art Museum, Aspen, CO
- 2007 BRAIN FORM, Guild & Greyshkul, New York, NY
- Capricci (possibilities of other worlds), Casino Luxembourg – Forum d'Art Contemporain, Luxembourg
- MASH, The Helena, New York, NY
- 2006 2006 Untitled (For H.C. Westermann), curated by Michael Rooks, The Contemporary Museum, Honolulu, HI
- Metaphysics of Youth, curated by Luigi Fassi and Irina Zucca Alessandrelli, Artenova-Fuoriuso, Pescara, Italy
- Turn the Beat Around, Sikkema Jenkins and Co., New York, NY
- Ionesco's Friends, curated by Irina Zucca Alessandrelli, Franco Soffiantino Arte Contemporanea, Turin, Italy
- 2005 Greater New York P.S.1, Queens, NY
- Who is the Protagonist? curated by Ohad Meromi, Guild & Greyshkul, New York, NY
- 2004 Pattern Playback, curated by Silvia Cubina, The Moore Space, Miami, FL
- Four-Ply, Andrea Rosen Gallery, New York, NY
- Hung, Drawn, and Quartered, curated by Miriam Katzeff, Team Gallery, New York, NY
- 2003 Pantone, curated by David Hunt, Massimo Audiello, New York, NY
- Burnt Orange, Heresy Space 101, Brooklyn, NY
