= Trailing twelve months =

Measurement of a company's financial performance

Trailing twelve months (TTM) is a measurement of a company's financial performance (income and expenses) used in finance. It is measured by using the income statements from a company's reports (such as interim, quarterly or annual reports), to calculate the income for the twelve-month period immediately prior to the date of the report. This figure is calculated by analysts because quarterly and interim reports often show only income from the preceding 3, 6 or 9 months, not a full year; because they do not represent a full year, such data can be skewed by seasonal trading patterns, such as higher sales over Christmas, giving a less accurate picture of a company's fiscal health.

Typically TTM figures are generated to show either the most recent twelve months of a company's trading or to show the last twelve months of its trading before a certain event, such as an acquisition, took place. If no quarterly or interim report has been issued between the last preliminary report or annual report and the date in question, then there is no need to generate trailing twelve months figures, because annual and preliminary reports already contain figures for 12 months.

Trailing twelve months figures are generated using the last interim or quarterly report a company has issued before the date in question. You generate a trailing twelve months figure for each item in the income statement by adding the figure for the reporting period since the company's financial year end to the figure in the annual report and taking off the figure for the matching period the previous year (e.g. 3 months from 1 Jan 2008 to 31 March 2008 plus 12 months to 31 December 2007 minus 3 months from 1 January 2007 to 31 March 2007 to give you 12 months from 1 April 2007 to (trailing) 31 March 2008).

A company's balance sheet is not affected by this, as a balance sheet only ever reflects a single point in time, not the events across a year.

== Example ==
If a Company reports $1 million in quarterly revenue in 3/31/2000, a $10 million yearly revenue on 12/31/2000, and $4 million quarterly revenue in 3/31/2001, the trailing twelve months revenue is calculated as $13 million as follows.

Most Recent Quarter(s) + Most Recent Year - The Corresponding Quarter(s) 12 Months Before the Most Recent Quarter(s)

$4m + $10m - $1m = $13m

The trailing twelve months calculation can also be presented like this:

	3 months ended Mar 31, 2000	12 months ended Dec 31, 2000	3 months ended Mar 31, 2001	12 months trailing Mar 31, 2001
US$m				
Revenue	1.0	10.0	4.0	13.0
Operating Profit	0.4	1.3	0.3	1.2
Net income	0.1	0.7	(0.2)	0.4
