= Craig Boundy =

British businessman

- Education: St Olave's Grammar School; Lancaster University (BA)
- Occupation: Business executive
- Employer: McAfee
- Known for: Executive roles at Experian and McAfee
- Title: President and Chief Executive Officer, McAfee
- Term: 21 August 2024 – present
- Children: 2

Craig Boundy is the President and CEO of online protection company McAfee effective August 21, 2024. He was the Chief Operating Officer of Experian PLC, the information services company. He is based in Costa Mesa, California.

== Early life and education ==
Boundy went to school at St Olave's Grammar School in Orpington, and then studied Management Studies and German at Lancaster University.

== Career ==
Boundy spent six years at British Telecom working in a range of finance, marketing and product management roles, both in the UK and overseas.

He worked at Energis, initially as Sales Director, in which he led the company's sales force in the UK and Ireland, and then as Chief Operating Officer, where he managed the company's financial performance and core operational processes.

He worked as Chief Operating Officer at Cable & Wireless Europe, Asia & US.

He was Chief Executive, Global Operations at Logica then chief executive officer at Logica the UK.

He joined Experian in November 2011 as managing director of Experian U.K. and Ireland. He was CEO of Experian North America between 2014 and 2022.

He was appointed to the Experian Board in 2022.

Craig is appointed CEO of McAfee, effective August 21, 2024

=== Financial inclusion ===
In 2019 Boundy led Experian's involvement in Operation HOPE, Inc. and serves on its board.

== Personal life ==
Boundy is married with two children, and is fluent in English, German and French.
