= Aditya Mittal =

Indian businessman (born 1976)

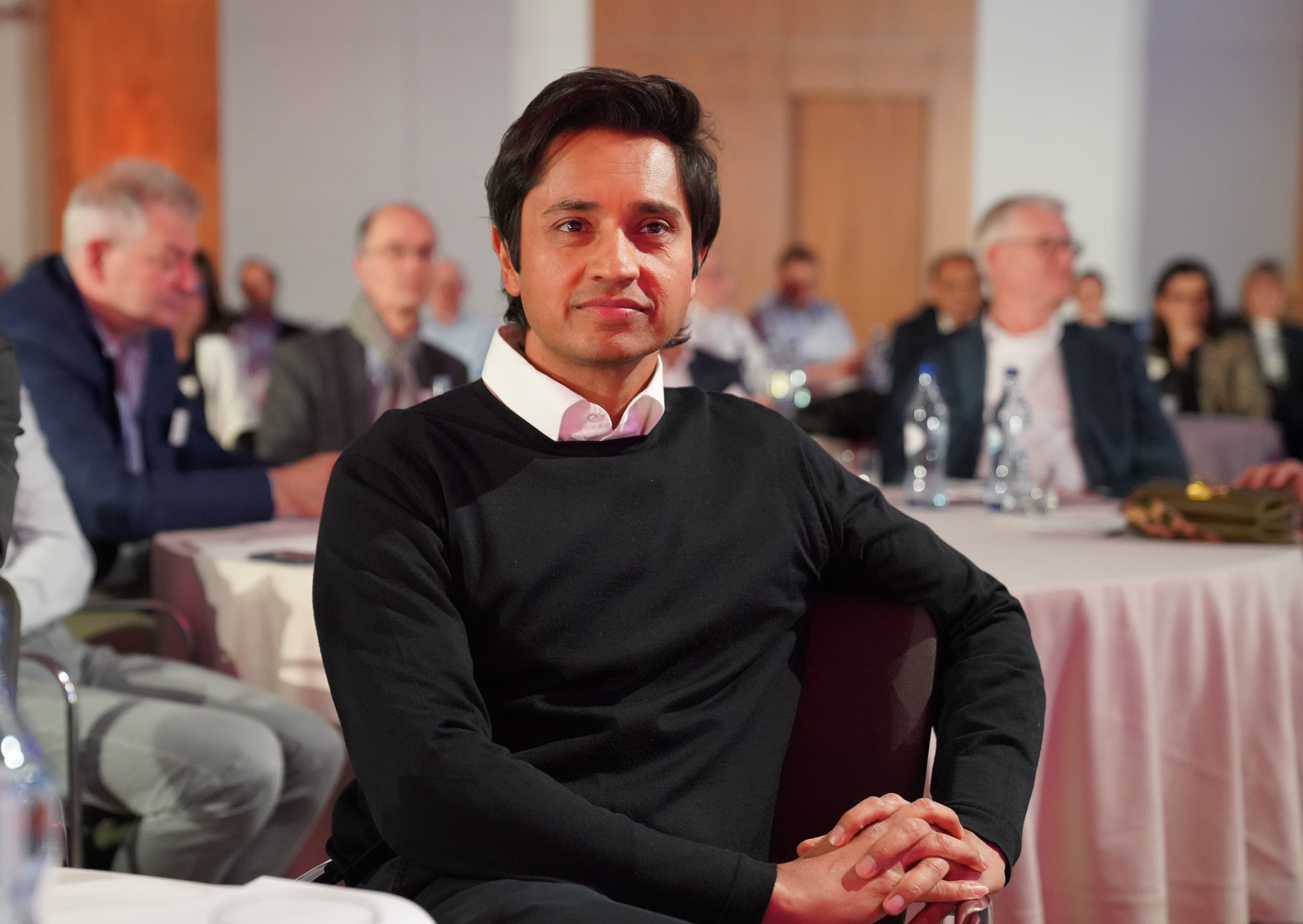
- Mittal in 2024
- Born: 22 January 1976 (age 50)
- Education: Jakarta Intercultural School; Wharton School of the University of Pennsylvania
- Occupations: CEO, ArcelorMittal
- Spouse: Megha Mittal
- Children: 3
- Parent(s): Lakshmi Mittal; Usha Mittal

Aditya Mittal (born 22 January 1976) is an Indian business heir and the CEO of ArcelorMittal which was founded by his father Lakshmi Mittal, who was ranked 21st in the 2012 Forbes list of billionaires.

== Education and career ==
Born in India and raised in Indonesia, Mittal attended high school at Jakarta International School. He has a bachelor's degree in economics from the Wharton School of the University of Pennsylvania in the US, from which he graduated in 1996.

He worked for a short time in the mergers and acquisitions department at investment bank Credit Suisse First Boston. He joined the family business in 1997 and was appointed Head of Mergers and Acquisitions in 1999, and has been involved in several purchases since then as Mittal Steel has played a major role in the consolidation of the global steel industry. He lives in London. He led Mittal Steel's offer for Arcelor that led to its acquisition and merger with Mittal Steel in 2006. The two companies were merged in 2006, with the merged company being named ArcelorMittal.

In 2009, he was ranked 4th in Fortune Magazine's "40 under 40" list.

In February 2021, he was appointed CEO of ArcelorMittal, succeeding his father.

== Appointments ==
Mittal is on the boards of ArcelorMittal, Aperam, Iconiq Capital, ArcelorMittal Nippon Steel India and HMEL.

He is a trustee at Brookings Institution, a member of the WSJ CEO Council, an alumnus of the World Economic Forum Young Global Leader’s Programme and a member of Harvard University’s Global Advisory Council.

== Investments ==
In 2025, Mittal invested $1 billion into Bill Chisholm’s purchase of the NBA’s Boston Celtics, giving him a significant stake in the team

== Charitable involvement ==
Mittal is involved with various charitable organisations, including the NSPCC in the UK.

In 2008, Aditya and Megha Mittal made a donation of £15m to Great Ormond Street Hospital in London, the largest private contribution the hospital had ever received. The donation was used to help fund their new facility, the Mittal Children's Medical Centre. On 17 January 2018, the Duchess of Cambridge officially opened the Mittal Children's Medical Centre at the Great Ormond Street Hospital.

== Personal life ==
Aditya Mittal is married to Megha Mittal, former owner of German fashion company Escada. The pre-wedding event was held at Victoria Memorial, Kolkata, with entertainment from Mallika Sarabhai and Shah Rukh Khan.

He has one sister, Vanisha, who is also a board member of ArcelorMittal. He has two daughters and a son.
