= Aujas Cybersecurity =

- Formerly: Aujas Networks
- Type: Privately held company
- Industry: Cybersecurity
- Founded: 2008; 18 years ago
- Founders: M. Srinivas Rao, Sameer Shelke, and Navin Kotian
- Headquarters: Bengaluru, India
- Number of locations: Bangalore, Mumbai, Gurgaon, Cupertino, Jersey City, Sharjah, Riyadh
- Area served: Worldwide
- Services: Identity and Access Management (IAM), Risk Advisory, Security Verification, Security Engineering, Managed Detection and Response (MDR), and Cloud Security Services
- Parent: NuSummit (formerly NSEIT Limited)
- Website: aujas.com

Aujas Cybersecurity, formerly Aujas Networks, is an Indian cybersecurity company. It is found in 2008. In 2019, NSEIT Limited, a wholly owned subsidiary of the National Stock Exchange of India, acquired Aujas Cybersecurity. In 2024, NSEIT was renamed NuSummit.
