= Symphony Technology Group =

American private equity firm

STG Partners, LLC
- Trade name: STG Partners
- Type: Private
- Industry: Private equity
- Predecessor: Symphony Technology Group (2002-2017)
- Founded: 2017; 9 years ago
- Founder: William "Bill" Chisholm
- Headquarters: 1300 El Camino Real, Suite 300, Menlo Park, California, U.S.
- Number of locations: 3 (Bangalore, India; London, England; Menlo Park, CA)
- Key people: Managing partner: William "Bill" Chisholm; Managing director and CFO: Stephen Henkenmeier; Managing directors: Marc A. Bala, Douglas M. Haines, and Johnie T. Treadwell
- AUM: $12 billion (2025) $11.7 billion (2024)
- Total assets: Less than $1 billion (2025)
- Owner: STG Management Holdings, L.P., "Greater than 75%"
- Number of employees: 88 (2025)
- Website: stg.com

STG Partners, LLC (STG) is an American private equity firm and based in Menlo Park, California. Its predecessor, Symphony Technology Group ("Symphony") was founded in 2002 by Romesh Wadhwani, William Chisholm, and Bryan Taylor. In 2017, Symphony was reorganized as STG Partners. As of March 2025, STG Partners managed approximately $12 billion in 19 pooled investment vehicle for its clients. The firm itself has less than one billion dollars in assets.

== History ==
In the early 2000s, Romesh Wadhwani invited Bill Chisholm to join new private equity firm, Symphony Technology Group (Symphony), as a senior investment partner. Bryan Taylor was also a co-founder of Symphony, and remained at the firm until 2004.

In 2017, Wadhwani retired as Symphony's CEO, and the firm was reorganized as STG Partners LLC. Chisholm assumed the CEO and ownership role.

In September 2021, STG Management Holdings, L.P., acquired "greater than 75%" of STG Partners.

The firm maintains offices in Bangalore, India, London, England, and Menlo Park, California. Stephen Henkenmeier is STG's managing director and CFO.

In March 2025, STG Partners reported $12 billion in assets under management (AUM), a slight increase from $11.7 billion AUM in 2024. In addition, Symphony Technology Group, which maintains an inter-company relationship with STG Partners, reported approximately $341 million AUM in March 2025.

== Acquisitions ==
Symphony acquired McGraw-Hill Construction from McGraw-Hill Financial for US$320 million on September 22, 2014. The acquisition includes Engineering News-Record, Architectural Record, Dodge and Sweet's. McGraw-Hill Construction has been renamed Dodge Data & Analytics.

On February 17, 2020, Dell Technologies sold its RSA Security business to a group led by STG in an all-cash transaction for $2.075 billion.

In March 2021, STG acquired McAfee Enterprise for $4 billion. On June 2, 2021, FireEye announced the sale of key software technologies to Symphony for $1.2 billion, while retaining the services business under the Mandiant name. FireEye bought Mandiant for around the same price. On January 18, 2022, Symphony announced the launch of Trellix, an extended detection and response company, which is a combination of FireEye and the McAfee enterprise business. In January 2022, STG announced the McAfee Enterprise security service edge (SSE) business would operate as a separate company to be known as Skyhigh Security. The cloud security company is headquartered in San Jose, California, and led by CEO Gee Rittenhouse.

On the same date, STG acquired media monitoring provider Kantar Reputation Intelligence, a former subsidiary of Kantar, alongside PR measurement workflow provider PRgloo, and US-based media analytics start up Onclusive. The merged company operates under the name Onclusive.

In March 2023, a private equity consortium led by STG agreed to acquire Momentive Global Inc. formerly SurveyMonkey, an experience management company, based in San Mateo, California, in an all-cash deal valued at $1.5 billion, and rebranded it back to SurveyMonkey.

In July 2023, Wrike, a project management platform, was acquired by STG for an undisclosed amount.

In November 2023, in a $1.4 billion deal, STG acquired Avid Technology, a Burlington, Mass.-based company that makes Sibelius, Pro Tools, Media Composer, and other products for the audio, video, and media industries.

On July 9, 2024, STG completed a £146.7 million acquisition of Gresham Technologies PLC, a UK-based provider of data integrity and post-trade processing software; the company was subsequently delisted from the London Stock Exchange. Following the transaction, STG merged Gresham with Alveo, an enterprise data management platform acquired by the firm in 2023, with the combined entity continuing under the Gresham brand.

== Divestments ==
- Symphony Teleca (from the merger of Teleca and Symphony Services) was sold to Harman International Industries in 2015.
