= Rashida Jones filmography =

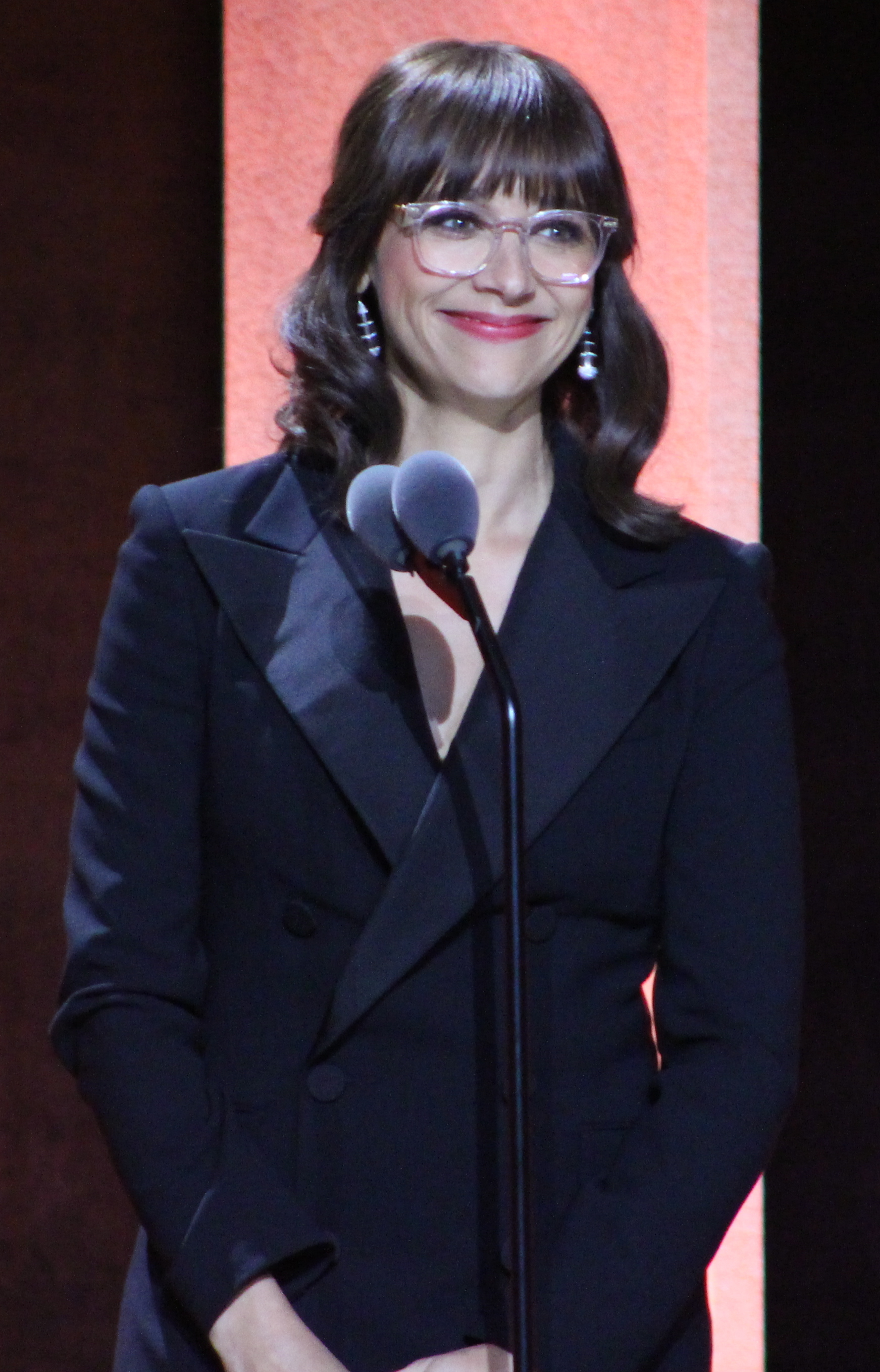
Jones at the 2017 Peabody Awards.

Rashida Jones is an American actress, writer, and producer, best known for starring on the NBC comedy series Parks and Recreation (2009–2015) as Ann Perkins, and as Karen Filippelli in The Office (2006–2009; 2011).

Jones first role of prominence was as Louisa Fenn on the Fox drama series Boston Public (2000–2002). From 2016 to 2019, Jones starred as the lead eponymous role in the TBS comedy series Angie Tribeca.

In film, Jones has appeared in I Love You, Man (2009), The Social Network (2010) and Celeste and Jesse Forever (2012), which she co-wrote. Jones also co-wrote the story of Toy Story 4 (2019).

As a filmmaker, she directed the first episode of Hot Girls Wanted, a series that focused on the sex industry. She was also executive producer of the series. In 2018, her documentary Quincy, about her father Quincy Jones, debuted on Netflix; it won the Grammy Award for Best Music Film in 2019.

== Filmography ==
=== Film ===
==== As an actor ====
Year	Title	Role	Notes
1998	Myth America	—N/a	
2000	East of A	Emily	
2001	Roadside Assistance	Lucy	Short film
2002	Full Frontal	—N/a	Uncredited
2002	Now You Know	Kerri	
2003	Death of a Dynasty	Layna Hudson	
2004	Little Black Book	Dr. Rachel Keyes	
2007	The Ten	Hostess Rebecca Fornier	
2008	Life in Flight	Nina	
2009	Brief Interviews with Hideous Men	Hannah	
2009	I Love You, Man	Zooey	
2010	Cop Out	Debbie	
2010	The Social Network	Marylin Delpy	
2010	Monogamy	Nat	
2011	The Big Year	Ellie	
2011	Friends with Benefits	Maddison	Uncredited
2011	Beastie Boys: Fight for Your Right (Revisited)	Skirt Suit	Short film
2011	Our Idiot Brother	Cindy Harris	
2011	The Muppets	Veronica Martin	Also on-set puppeteer of Dolores the Trumpet Girl
2012	Celeste and Jesse Forever	Celeste Martin	
2013	Decoding Annie Parker	Kim	
2014	Cuban Fury	Julia	
2015	Inside Out	Emotions of Cool Girl	Voices
2015	A Very Murray Christmas	The Bride	
2017	Don't Come Back from the Moon	Eva Smalley	
2018	Zoe	Emma	
2018	Tag	Cheryl Deakins	
2018	Quincy	Herself	Documentary
2018	The Grinch	Donna Lou Who	Voice
2018	White Fang	Maggie Scott	Voice role (English dub)
2019	The Sound of Silence	Ellen Chasen	
2019	Between Two Ferns: The Movie	Herself	
2019	Klaus	Alva	Voice
2019	Spies in Disguise	Marcy Kappel	Voice
2020	On the Rocks	Laura Keane	
2026	In the Blink of an Eye	Claire	
2026	Good Sex		Post-production
2026	Hexed	Alice	Voice

==== As director/writer/producer ====
Year	Title	Director	Writer	Producer	Notes
2012	Celeste and Jesse Forever	No	Yes	Executive	
2015	Hot Girls Wanted	No	No	Yes	Documentary
2018	Quincy	Yes	Yes	Yes	Documentary
2019	Toy Story 4	No	Story	No	story credits with Andrew Stanton, John Lasseter, Josh Cooley, Valerie LaPointe, Will McCormack, Martin Hynes, Stephany Folsom
2024	A Swim Lesson	Yes	No	Executive	Short film
2026	The Invite	No	Yes	No	

=== Television ===
==== As actor ====
Year	Title	Role	Notes
1997	The Last Don	Johanna	Miniseries
2000	If These Walls Could Talk 2	Feminist	Television film; segment: "1972"
2000	Freaks and Geeks	Karen Scarfolli	2 episodes
2000–2002	Boston Public	Louisa Fenn	26 episodes
2003–2004	Chappelle's Show	Pam, Woman in "Love Contract"	2 episodes
2004	Strip Search	—N/a	Television film; deleted scenes
2004	NY-LON	Edie Miller	7 episodes
2005	Stella	Karen	Episode: "Pilot"
2005	Wanted	Detective Carla Merced	13 episodes
2005	Our Thirties	Liz	Television short
2006–2009; 2011	The Office	Karen Filippelli	26 episodes
2007	Saturday Night Live	Karen Filippelli	Episode: "Rainn Wilson/Arcade Fire"; uncredited
2007	Wainy Days	Wainette Davids	Episode: "A Woman's Touch"
2008	Unhitched	Kate	6 episodes
2009	Robot Chicken	Casper, Little Orphan Annie, Molly, Princess	Voice role; episode: "Tell My Mom"
2009–2015, 2020	Parks and Recreation	Ann Perkins	107 episodes
2010	Vamped Out	Dispensary Receptionist	Voice role; episode: "Hungry Hungry Al"
2011	Wilfred	Lisa	Episode: "Respect"
2011–2014	Web Therapy	Hayley Feldman-Tate	4 episodes
2012	Who Do You Think You Are?	Herself	Episode: "Rashida Jones"
2012	The Cleveland Show	Daisy	Voice role; episode: "All You Can Eat"
2012–2013	Billy on the Street	Herself	2 episodes
2013	The Simpsons	Portia	Voice role; episode: "Changing of the Guardian"
2013	Kroll Show	Various	Episode: "The Greatest Hits of It"
2013	Comedy Bang! Bang!	Herself	Episode: "Rashida Jones Wears a Black Blazer & Flowered Pants"
2013–2015	The Awesomes	Hotwire	Voice role; 26 episodes
2014–2015	A to Z	Whalen	Episode: "M is for Meant to Be"
2014	Key & Peele	Colin's Wife	Episode: "Dying Wife"
2016	Zoolander: Super Model	D'Jangelo	Voice role; television film
2016–2018	Angie Tribeca	Angie Tribeca	40 episodes
2017–2018	Black-ish	Santamonica Jackson	Episodes: "Sister, Sister" and "Inheritance"
2018	Portlandia	Amanda	Episode: "Abracadabra"
2018	Neo Yokio	Female Announcer, Subway Robot	Voice role; episode: "Pink Christmas"
2020–2022	Duncanville	Mia Abara, Herself	Voice role; series regular
2020	BlackAF	Joya Barris	Series regular
2021	Waffles + Mochi	Cheryl	Episode: "Corn"
2021	Mixed-ish	Santamonica Jackson	Voice role; episode: "Forever Young"
2021	Toast of Tinseltown	Billy Tarzana	4 episodes
2023	Silo	Allison Becker	Episode: "Freedom Day"
2024	Sunny	Suzie Sakamoto	Main role
2025	Black Mirror	Amanda	Episode: "Common People"

==== As director/writer/producer ====
Year	Title	Creator	Director	Writer	Executive Producer	Notes
2014–2015	A to Z	No	No	Yes	Yes	Wrote episode: "G Is for Geronimo"
2016	Black Mirror	No	No	Yes	No	Episode: "Nosedive"
2016–2018	Angie Tribeca	No	Yes	No	Producer	Directed 2 episodes
2017	Hot Girls Wanted: Turned On	No	Yes	No	Yes	Directed episode: "Women on Top"
2017–2022	Claws	No	No	No	Yes	
2020	BlackAF	No	Yes	No	Yes	Directed episode: "still...because of slavery"
2021–2022	Kevin Can F**k Himself	No	No	No	Yes	
2022	Roar	No	Yes	No	No	Episode: "The Woman Who Found Bite Marks on Her Skin"
2023	The Other Black Girl	Yes	No	Yes	Yes	Wrote episode: "They Say I'm Different"
2024	Sunny	No	No	No	Yes	

=== Music videos ===
Year	Title	Other performer(s)	Album
2002	"More Than a Woman"	Aaliyah	Aaliyah
2005	"Be Gentle with Me"	The Boy Least Likely To	The Best Party Ever
2007	"Long Road to Ruin"	Foo Fighters	Echoes, Silence, Patience and Grace
2010	"We Are the World 25 for Haiti"	Artists for Haiti	—N/a
2011	"Make Some Noise"	Beastie Boys	Hot Sauce Committee Part Two
2013	"Brave"	Sara Bareilles	The Blessed Unrest
2014	"Part II (On the Run)"	Jay-Z featuring Beyoncé	Magna Carta Holy Grail
2016	"Flip and Rewind"	Boss Selection featuring Rashida Jones	Volume 1
2017	"Family Feud"	Jay-Z featuring Beyoncé	4:44
2018	"Nice for What"	Drake	Scorpion
