= Miki Bunge =

German publisher

Miki Bunge (born 1963 in Brussels, Belgium) is a German publisher and the founder of Goliath Books.

== Career ==
After graduating from high school in 1982, Bunge began his career as a painter near Deisenroth and actively worked as an independent artist. He was the winner of the European Short Film Prize in 1983. After studying medicine, in 1992 he passed his final medical studies examination and moved to New York City where he continued his work as an artist. This was followed by several exhibitions and projects, such as the RIP Projects with Mic Murphy of The System and artist Hoyt Brown.

After various group and solo exhibitions he curated the First Independent Art Fair in 1994 and KunstArt in 1996, both in Frankfurt, Germany.

With images found at flea markets, Bunge published his first books, “UFO” by Richard Brunswick and “Bondage” by Laura Manson Stansfield, as part of an art project. He founded his publishing company, Goliath Books in 1997. In 2003 the Goliath Books moved from New York to London, England. In 2004 another branch opened in Barcelona, Spain. Since 2006 the Goliath’s headquarters has been located in Berlin, Germany. To date Goliath has published more than 80 titles about photography and two magazines BuschBusch and Wallpaper Of Fame.

== Notable Curated artists ==
- Yoichiro Kawaguchi (Digital Art, Venice Biennale)

== Notable published artists and photographers ==
- Dave Naz (Legs)
- Holly Randall (E.Dream G.)
- Paul M. Smith (Paul M. Smith)
- Leonardo Glauso (Private Nudes)

== Bibliography ==
Miki Bunge, Brüssel (1982 & 84)

Miki Bunge, 13 paintings (1992)

Independent Art Fair (1994)

Mein heimliches Auge (1995)

KunstArt (1996)

Eva (1997)

UFO (Richard Brunswick,1997)

Bondage (Laura Manson Stansfield,1998)

Ebby Thust (1999)

My Favorite Model (2007)

Latex Fashion Photography (2011)

== Filmography ==
Baba (1983)

Im Lauf der Zeit (1984)

Bonaza Family (1984)

Girls smoking weed (2010)

== See also ==
- Staff (January 2008). "Goliath – kunstvolle Erotik, von sinnlich bis ekstatisch". Cherry: 87–89.
- Spitz, Susanne (28 August 2009). "Goliath – der Verlag für besondere Bücher". Provoqué. Archived from the original on 7 September 2012.
- Staff (29 June 2011). "Goliath Books: Latex Fashion Photography Bible". Burlesque Fashion.
