= Goliath Books =

Publisher of art and photography books

- Founded: 1997
- Founder: Miki Bunge
- Country of origin: Germany
- Headquarters location: Frankfurt am Main, Berlin
- Distribution: SCB Distribution (US); Turnaround Publisher Services (UK)
- Publication types: Books
- Nonfiction topics: art and photography
- Official website: http://www.goliathbooks.com/

Goliath Books is a publisher of art and photography books, founded in 1997 by Miki Bunge in New York. Goliath's objective is to publish diverse and daring photography and art books and to introduce controversial, erotic and fringe themes to a mainstream audience. Goliath continues to be noteworthy for their ongoing publication of artists who fall outside traditional practices. The publisher's ongoing mission is to explore and transform the public's approach to art, erotic themes, pornography and perspectives from a range of subcultures.

== Themes ==
Photography books on subculture themes such as leather, latex, nylons, spanking, bondage and more traditional erotic art photography, such as modern pin-up girls and the male nude are included under Goliath's publication. Topics such as boxing, UFOs, motorcycles, and cult or bizarre subjects also fall into the range of Goliath's themes.

== Books and artists ==
The first book published by Goliath, titled UFO by Richard Brunswick (pseudonym), documented the UFO phenomenon and was intended to be a humorous publication. More recent art publications have included Paul M. Smith, German artist Bodo Korsig, as well as photography by Los Angeles-based artist Charlie White and Charles Gatewood, documentor of the subcultural sexual revolution in New York in the 1960s and 1970s. Goliath has published books with the works of erotic photographer and punk-rocker Dave Naz, the Belgian artist Pierre Radisic, rock photographer Derek Ridgers, gender provocateur and chronicler of the industrial and goth culture Fred Berger, artist and photographer Paul Smith, fashion, fine art, erotic and fetish photographer Christine Kessler as well as erotic photographer and producer Holly Randall, hemp-activist Rob Griffin, alternative sex’n’punk photographer The Lovely Brenda from New York, retro pin-up specialist Octavio Arizala or fetish fashion photographer Emma Delves-Broughton. In addition to publishing the work of professional photographers, Goliath also has an "amateur series" which culls the works of amateur photographers with a focus on subculture and fringe themes.

== Notable titles ==
- Holly Randall, Erotic Dream Girls, Goliath, 2009 ISBN 978-3-936709-39-1
- Leonardo Glauso, Private Nudes, Goliath, 2017 ISBN 978-3957300249
