= Irv Levin =

American businessman and film producer (1921–1996)

- Born: Irving H. Levin; September 8, 1921; Chicago, Illinois, U.S.
- Died: March 20, 1996 (aged 74); Brentwood, Los Angeles, U.S.
- Occupation: film producer
- Children: 1 son, 2 daughters

Irving H. Levin (September 8, 1921 – March 20, 1996) was an American film producer and business executive with the National General Corporation. He was also the owner of the National Basketball Association's Boston Celtics and San Diego Clippers.

== Biography ==
Levin was raised in Chicago. He was of Jewish descent. He served as a bombardier during World War II stationed in California. He later moved to California where his father-in-law helped him to get a job in the film industry.

Levin began his film career as the president of Filmmakers Releasing Organization, a film distribution company founded by independent producers Collier Young and Ida Lupino. When American Broadcasting-Paramount Theatres, Inc. decided to expand to film production in 1956, Levin was named the first president of the Am-Par Picture Corporation. AB-PT sold Levin and Harry L. Mandell AB-PT Pictures and AB-PT Distribution Corporation in May 1958 and reformed the company as Atlas Pictures Corporation. Levin and Mandell then brought on Maurice Duke and Henry F. Ehrlich to form a TV production company, Sindee Productions Inc. with its first series Pancho Villa through distributor MCA.

In 1961, Levin joined National Theaters & Television, Inc. as a vice president. In 1962 Eugene V. Klein restructured the company into National General Corp., where Levin served as the executive vice president from 1962 to 1969 and president and CEO from 1969 to 1972. Levin was also president of NGC's entertainment assets, which included National General Pictures and The Chinese Theatre.

In April 1972, Levin and attorney Harold A. Lipton (father of actress Peggy Lipton) purchased the Boston Celtics for $3.7 Million. The sale was rejected by the NBA as a result of conflict of interest concerns due to fellow National General directors Sam Schulman and Eugene V. Klein owning the Seattle SuperSonics. Levin and Lipton were forced to sell their shares to Robert Schmertz that May for $3.95 Million with an option for the two to repurchase half of the Celtics' stock. After two years of litigation, Levin and Lipton were able exercise their option. Ten months later they purchased the remaining stock from Leisure Technology.

Levin had long wanted to own a team in California, but knew that the NBA would not even consider letting him move the Celtics. In 1978, with this in mind, Levin and Lipton swapped their shares in the Celtics with John Y. Brown, Jr. and Harry T. Mangurian, Jr. for their shares in the Buffalo Braves. The Braves were relocated to San Diego, where they became the San Diego Clippers. On May 4, 1981, Levin sold the Clippers to Donald Sterling for $13.5 million.

== Personal life ==
He divorced his first wife, Lenore, in 1971; they had three children: Donna, Lon and Sindee. His second wife, Michelle, died in a car accident. He had a long affair with actress Carol White.

== Films produced by Levin ==
- Crashout (1955)
- Eighteen and Anxious (1957)
- Hell to Eternity (1960)
- Operation Thunderbolt (1977)
- To Live and Die in L.A. (1985)

Sporting positions
Preceded by Ballantine Brewery	Boston Celtics principal owner April 1972-May 1972	Succeeded by Robert Schmertz
Preceded by Robert Schmertz	Boston Celtics principal owner 1975–1978	Succeeded by John Y. Brown Jr.
Preceded by John Y. Brown Jr.	Buffalo Braves/San Diego Clippers principal owner 1978–1981	Succeeded by Donald Sterling
