= Robert Schmertz =

American real estate developer and sports franchise owner

- Born: November 15, 1926
- Died: July 24, 1975 (aged 48); New York City, New York, U.S.
- Occupation: Real estate developer
- Known for: Co-owner of the Portland Trail Blazers; Co-owner of the Boston Celtics
- Spouse: Phyllis Kane

Robert Schmertz (November 15, 1926 – July 24, 1975) was an American real estate developer and sports franchise owner. He was owner or part-owner of two NBA franchises; the Portland Trail Blazers from 1970 through 1972, and the Boston Celtics from 1972 until 1975. He also owned the New England Whalers of the World Hockey Association, and the New York Stars of the now-defunct World Football League. Schmertz also founded Leisure Technology, a developer of retirement communities.

== Biography ==
Born to a Jewish family, Schmertz attended Hackensack High School, where he played center on the school's basketball team. The school inducted him into its Sports Hall of Fame in 1973. In 1970, Schmertz, along with his friends Larry Weinberg and Herman Sarkowsky, paid $3.7MM to secure an NBA expansion team for Portland.

In 1975, Schmertz was indicted by a New Jersey grand jury on bribery charges Schmertz pleaded innocent to the charges. In July of that year, he suffered a stroke and died on July 24. Leisure Technology would become a major developer of retirement communities, but would go bankrupt in 1991.

Prior to his death in New York City, Schmertz lived in Lakewood Township, New Jersey.

Preceded by Irv Levin and Harold Lipton	Boston Celtics principal owner November 1972–July 24, 1975	Succeeded by Irv Levin and Harold Lipton
