= Christmas Special =

Christmas Special may refer to:

== Television episodes ==
- "Christmas Special" (30 Rock)
- "Christmas Special" (Beavis and Butt-head episode)
- "Christmas Special" (Extras)
- "Christmas Special" (The Naked Brothers Band)
- "Christmas Special" (Robot Chicken episode)
- "The Christmas Special", an episode of Regular Show
- S Club 7: Christmas Special, a one-off TV special by the UK pop group

== Other uses ==
- Christmas Special (album), a 2010 album by The Boy Least Likely To
