= Kidada Jones =

American actress and fashion designer

- Born: Kidada Ann Jones; Los Angeles, California, U.S.
- Education: Fashion Institute for Design and Merchandising (attended)
- Occupations: Actress; model; fashion designer
- Years active: 1994–present
- Spouse: Jeffrey Nash (m. 2003; div. 2006)
- Partner: LL Cool J (1992–1994)
- Parents: Quincy Jones; Peggy Lipton
- Relatives: Harold Lipton (grandfather); Rashida Jones (sister); Quincy Jones III (half-brother); Kenya Kinski-Jones (half-sister)

Kidada Ann Jones (/kɪˈdɑːdə/ kih-DAH-də) is an American actress, model, wardrobe stylist, and fashion designer. She works as a designer for The Walt Disney Company, and has a line there known as Kidada for Disney Couture. Jones is a daughter of record producer Quincy Jones and actress Peggy Lipton.

== Early life and education ==
The elder daughter of the marriage between composer/arranger Quincy Jones and actress Peggy Lipton, Jones was born in Los Angeles, California. She is Jewish on her mother's side, and African-American on her father's side. Lipton's parents were Harold Lipton, a corporate lawyer, and Rita Benson, an artist.

Jones was raised in Bel-Air with her younger sister Rashida, who is an actress and screenwriter. After her parents divorced when she was eleven, Jones lived with her father and her sister lived with their mother. Jones attended the Los Angeles Fashion Institute for Design and Merchandising and left at age 19 to work with the designer Tommy Hilfiger.

== Career ==
Jones began working as a celebrity stylist for her father's publication Vibe magazine. She gained attention when she styled pop star Michael Jackson for the cover of Vibe in 1995. She was recruited by designer Tommy Hilfiger, who launched a successful ad campaign centered on Jones and a group of her friends (including Aaliyah, Tamia, Kate Hudson, Nicole Richie, and Oliver Hudson). She worked as his muse for eight years. Jones' fashion work included designing a clothing line for Snoop Dogg for three years. Jones also appeared during this period as a model in such fashion magazines as Elle, Vogue, and Harper's Bazaar.

Since 2005, Jones has been working with The Walt Disney Company, designing for Kidada for Disney Couture. W magazine described this as "a line of clothing and jewelry for adults sold at boutiques" and said that Jones acts "as a conduit to hip tastemakers the brand might otherwise miss". According to Jim Calhoun, Disney's executive vice president of consumer products, North America, "Kidada is not just one of those people that points out what's cool. She has a real hand in making things cool." She also consults on Disney projects.

In 2017, Jones published School of Awake, a book meant to empower young girls. Jones also appeared on Oprah Winfrey's Super Soul Sunday.

== Personal life ==
Jones dated rapper and actor LL Cool J from 1992 to 1994. In his autobiography, I Make My Own Rules, LL Cool J stated that he ended their relationship because they "didn't believe the same things". "She praised a guru and statues, and I praise God," he said.

Jones dated rapper and actor Tupac Shakur in 1996. They lived together for four months until his death. She was in their Las Vegas hotel room when he was shot on September 7, 1996, and she was at the hospital with Shakur when he died from his injuries six days later.

In 1999, Jones dated actor Leonardo DiCaprio. She was married to actor Jeffrey Nash from 2003 until 2006.

Jones had a close friendship with singer and actress Aaliyah whom she met while modeling for Tommy Hilfiger. They remained friends until Aaliyah's death in August 2001.
