= The Boy Least Likely To =

English indie pop duo

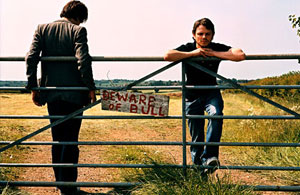
- The Boy Least Likely To

Background information
- Origin: Wendover, England
- Genres: Indie pop, twee pop
- Years active: 2002–present
- Labels: Too Young To Die
- Members: Pete Hobbs, Jof Owen
- Website: http://www.theboyleastlikelyto.co.uk/

The Boy Least Likely To is an English indie pop duo, composed of composer/multi-instrumentalist Pete Hobbs and lyricist/singer Jof Owen.

== History ==
Owen and Hobbs both grew up in the village of Wendover in Buckinghamshire. After meeting at school, Owen and Hobbs began writing and recording songs as The Boy Least Likely To in the summer of 2002. Creating their own independent record label, Too Young to Die, the band's first release was the 7" single "Paper Cuts" in 2003. They released three singles and completed the recording of their debut album before playing any live shows. The debut album, The Best Party Ever, which compiled the band's first three singles and added five new tracks, was released in the UK in February 2005, and in the United States in late Spring 2006.

The Best Party Ever was included in the Pitchfork top 50 albums of 2005 and was number 8 in the Rough Trade Shop top 100 albums of the same year.

The band describe their own sound as 'Country Disco' in their song "I'm Glad I Hitched My Apple Wagon To Your Star". They were included in the top ten bands of 2006 in Rolling Stone magazine, and described as sounding like what would happen "if all your childhood stuffed animals got together and started a band."

Their second album, Law of the Playground, was delayed by label troubles and released in April 2009. It includes the singles "Every Goliath Has Its David", "A Balloon On A Broken String", "When Life Gives Me Lemons I Make Lemonade" and "A Fairytale Ending".

In December 2010, they released a seasonal album called Christmas Special, which included eight original compositions and three traditional festive songs. It includes the single "George and Andrew".

The fourth album, The Great Perhaps, was released in 2013. It Includes the singles "It Could've Been Me" featuring Gwenno Saunders from The Pipettes, "Climbing Out Of love", "I Keep Falling In Love With You Again" and "Michael Collins", a song written about the Apollo 11 astronaut Michael Collins.

In 2014 Jof Owen formed the band Legends Of Country, and released the singles "That's What We Talk About When We Talk About Country" and "It's A Long Way Back From A Dream", a song about the darts player Richie Burnett.

== In popular culture ==
Rashida Jones starred in the video for their single "Be Gentle with Me" in 2005. Their songs have been used in a number of different commercials in the US for Coca-Cola and General Electric Cars and films and television shows including Easy A and Grey's Anatomy. "Be Gentle With Me" has been featured in a commercial in the UK for ING Direct and "I'm Glad I Hitched My Apple Wagon To Your Star" was used in a UK commercial for Cadburys Chocolate Digestive Biscuits in 2008. In February 2010, Apple, Inc. featured The Boy Least Likely To's song "Stringing Up Conkers" in an advertisement for the iPhone 3GS. In April 2010, the same song was also featured in an iPad demonstration video for iTunes. In April 2014 the song "Be Gentle With Me" was featured during the first 30 seconds of trailer #2 for the movie Blended starring Adam Sandler and Drew Barrymore. The song "When Life Gives Me Lemons, I Make Lemonade" was used in the 2010 Emma Stone comedy Easy A and in the 2018 film Peter Rabbit, which were both directed by Will Gluck.

== Touring personnel ==
Musicians known to have toured with The Boy Least Likely To include:

- Alistair Hamer - Drums, Backing vocals. (Sweet Billy Pilgrim)
- Anthony Bishop - Electric Bass, Backing Vocals (Sweet Billy Pilgrim)
- Adam Chetwood - Guitar, Banjo. (I Am Arrows)
- Amanda Applewood - Keys, Backing Vocals.
- Bahar Brunton - Violin, Backing Vocals.
- Boris Ming - Violin, Keys.
- Rob Jones - Glockenspiel, Backing Vocals. (The Voluntary Butler Scheme)
- Ross Curnow - Drums, Backing Vocals (Captain Phoenix)
- Luke Keyte - Guitar, Banjo (Captain Phoenix)
- Alistair Pope - guitar, banjo, synth (solo, Leonie Casanova)

== Discography ==
=== Albums ===
- The Best Party Ever - Too Young to Die - 2005
- Law of the Playground - Too Young to Die - 2009
- The Best B-Sides Ever - +1 Records - 2009
- Christmas Special - Too Young to Die - 2010
- The Great Perhaps - Too Young To Die - 2013

=== Compilation ===
- The Greatest Hits - Rough Trade - 2018

=== Extended plays ===
- a fairytale ending - Too Young To Die - 2010 released as a digital download only

=== Singles ===
- "Paper Cuts b/w Sleeping With a Gun Under My Pillow" - Too Young to Die 2003
- "Be Gentle with Me" - Too Young to Die 2003
- "Fur Soft as Fur" - Karma Lion - 2004
- "Hugging My Grudge" - Too Young to Die - 2004
- "Paper Cuts" - Too Young to Die - 2005
- "Little Donkey" - Too Young to Die - 2005 given away free to fans at Christmas
- "Be Gentle with Me" - Too Young to Die - 2006 UK No. 62
- "Hugging My Grudge" - Too Young to Die - 2006 UK No. 66
- "Faith" - Too Young to Die - 2007 released as a limited edition download
- "I Box Up All The Butterflies" - Too Young to Die - 2008 released as a limited edition free download
- "The First Snowflake" - Too Young to Die - 2009
- "Every Goliath Has Its David" - Too Young to Die - 2009
- "When Life Gives Me Lemons I Make Lemonade" - Too Young to Die - 2009
- "Fairytale Ending" - Too Young to Die - 2009
- "Summer Of a Dormouse" - For Us Records - 2009
- "George and Andrew" - Too Young to Die - 2010
- "I Keep Falling In Love with You Again" - Too Young To Die - 2013
- "Climbing Out of Love" - Too Young To Die - 2013
- "It Could've Been Me" - Too Young To Die - 2013
- "Michael Collins" - Too Young To Die - 2013
