= Law of the Playground (album) =

The Law of the Playground

Studio album by The Boy Least Likely To
- Released: April 14, 2009
- Recorded: 2008
- Genre: Indie pop
- Length: 37:11
- Label: Too Young to Die
- Producer: Jamie Johnson, Peter Hobbs

The Boy Least Likely To chronology
| The Best Party Ever (2005) | The Law of the Playground (2009) | Christmas Special (2010) |

Professional ratings
Review scores
| Source | Rating |
|---|---|
| AllMusic | 3/5 stars |
| BBC | Favorable |
| Pitchfork Media | (7.5/10) |

The Law of the Playground is the second studio album by British indie pop band The Boy Least Likely To. Released on Too Young to Die (which is their own label), The Law of the Playground was released in April 2009.

== Track listing ==
1. "Saddle Up"
2. "A Balloon On A Broken String"
3. "I Box Up All The Butterflies"
4. "The Boy With Two Hearts"
5. "Stringing Up Conkers"
6. "The Boy Least Likely To Is A Machine"
7. "Whiskers"
8. "Every Goliath Has Its David"
9. "When Life Gives Me Lemons I Make Lemonade"
10. "The Nature Of The Boy Least Likely To"
11. "I Keep Myself To Myself"
12. "The Worm Forgives The Plough"
13. "A Fairytale Ending"
