= Jill Bauer =

American film director, writer, and journalist

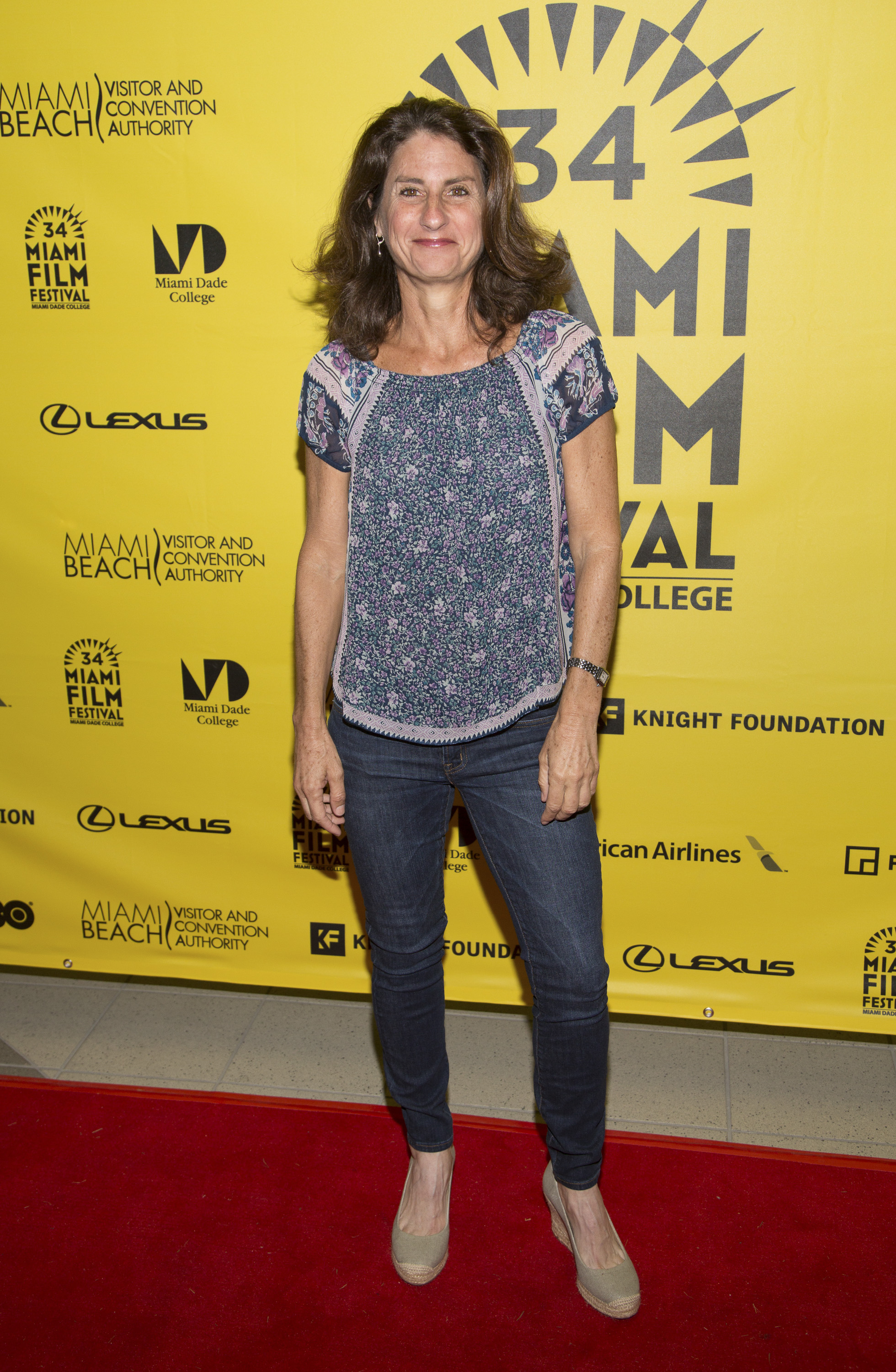
- Bauer at the 2017 Miami International Film Festival presentation of Hot Girls Wanted: Turned On

Jill Bauer is a Hearst and SPJ journalist, documentarian and non-fiction author. Bauer and Ronna Gradus co-directed two documentary films, Sexy Baby (2012) and Hot Girls Wanted (2015). Bauer also authored a non-fiction humor book called From ‘I Do’ to ‘I’ll Sue’: An Irreverent Compendium for Survivors of Divorce. Sexy Baby won the Founders Prize for Best Film by a First Time Director at the 2012 Traverse City Film Festival and Hot Girls Wanted was nominated in 2015 for a Primetime Emmy and the Grand Jury Prize at the Sundance Film Festival.

== Background ==
When she was 15 years old, Bauer interviewed Barbara Walters, an experience that encouraged her never to stop asking questions. After graduating from the University of Florida in 1985 with a bachelor's degree in journalism. Bauer began working for Esquire magazine where she stayed as a research assistant until 1993. In September 1995, Bauer launched SmartKid magazine. SmartKid was created for parents of children 7–13 years old and focused on the "executive father and mother, as opposed to the at-home mom most frequently targeted by traditional parenting magazines." Bauer worked as the managing editor for SmartKid magazine until September 1997.

Over the next 30 years of her career, Bauer worked as a journalist and editor at the Miami Herald, Miami Magazine, The New York Times and The Dallas Morning News. At the Miami Herald, one of Bauer’s main beats was focusing on relationships. From 2006 to 2009, she was an editorial contributor for the University of Miami Magazine and since December 2008 she has been a director and producer for Two to Tangle Productions. In 2008, Bauer met photographer Ronna Gradus while they were both working at the Miami Herald. The two would both leave their jobs at the Miami Herald and work on subsequent documentary projects together.

== Sexy Baby ==
Sexy Baby, a documentary about "sexiness and the cyber age" premiered worldwide at the 2012 Tribeca Film Festival. It was produced by Two to Tangle Productions. Bauer co-directed the film along with Ronna Gradus. The film was born out of an experience Gradus had while photographing college-aged girls dancing on stripper poles while on assignment for the Miami Herald. The film has been discussed on several news outlet websites including The Wall Street Journal, The Huffington Post, The Washington Post, Vanity Fair, and The Today Show. In an interview with TribecaFilm.com, Bauer and Madus explained their primary objective for the film was "to get people to have an emotional reaction to the film in order to start this long-overdue conversation." Sexy Baby won the Founders Prize for Best Film by a First Time Director at the 2012 Traverse City Film Festival.

== Hot Girls Wanted ==
Hot Girls Wanted is Bauer’s second documentary film. The film premiered at the 2014 Sundance Film Festival and was later released on Netflix in May 2015. Bauer co-directed this film with Ronna Gradus, her former co-director for Sexy Baby. The film focuses on several 18-25 year-old women and their experiences in the “amateur” pornographic film industry. The film especially focuses on young women who are enticed into the pornography industry often as a way out of their small towns. Initially, directors Bauer and Gradus planned to explore male consumption of pornography on college campuses. After some investigation, the filmmakers discovered these men were watching videos consisting of young women just out of high school, and the filmmakers then chose to change the subject of their film to focus on the young women. Hot Girls Wanted was nominated in for a 2015 Primetime Emmy Award and the Grand Jury Prize at the 2015 Sundance Film Festival. After premiering at the Sundance Film Festival, the filmmakers edited the film in accordance to feedback and comments from the festival's audience.

== Non-fiction book ==
Bauer wrote the non-fiction humor book “From ‘I Do’ to ‘I’ll Sue’: An Irreverent Compendium for Survivors of Divorce.” The 256-page paperback book features a mixture of "facts, quotes and anecdotes about divorce" and was published on April 1, 1993 by Plume.
