= Humphry Knipe =

South African sociologist (1941–2023)

- Born: Victor Humphry Knipe; 20 September 1941 Kimberley, South Africa
- Died: 16 January 2023 (aged 81)
- Occupation: Author
- Genre: Fiction, Sociology
- Spouse: Suze Randall (m. 1975)
- Children: 3, including Holly

Website
- www.neroprediction.com

Victor Humphry Knipe (20 September 1941 – 16 January 2023) was a sociology and history author, and adult film writer, director, and website administrator. He was a co-author of The Dominant Man: The Pecking Order in Human Society, a sociology book which has been translated into five languages, and the sole author of The Nero Prediction, a historic novel about Emperor Nero and astrology, which won the 2006 Independent Publisher Book Award for "Best Historical Fiction."

== Biography ==
Humphry Knipe was born in Kimberley, South Africa, on 20 September 1941. He graduated from Rhodes University, and majored in History and English. He moved to England in the 1960s, where he met his future wife, erotic photographer Suze Randall. They immigrated to Los Angeles in 1975, and wrote about their experiences in Hugh Hefner's Playboy Mansion in the book Suze.

Mostly in the 1980s, Knipe wrote and directed several Suze Randall produced pornographic films under the nom de porn Victor Nye.

The couple later resided in Malibu, California, where he managed Randall's erotic web sites, and administered much of the business of Suze Randall Productions as Haaren Enterprises, Ltd., using his first name, Victor Knipe.

They had three children, including daughter Holly Randall, an erotic photographer who also assisted in the business.

== Bibliography ==
- The Dominant Man: The Pecking Order in Human Society, with George Maclay, 1972, ISBN 0-285-62028-2
- Suze, with Suze Randall, 1977, ISBN 0-900735-42-2
- The Nero Prediction, 2005, ISBN 0-9760822-2-5

== Partial filmography ==
- Star Virgin (1979)
- Kiss and Tell (1980) aka KOCK-FM 69
- Miss Passion (1984)
- Love Bites (1985)
- Too Naughty to Say No (1985)
- Sky Foxes (1987)
- Erotic Eye (1995) aka Suze Randall's Erotic Eye
