= Suze Randall =

English photographer

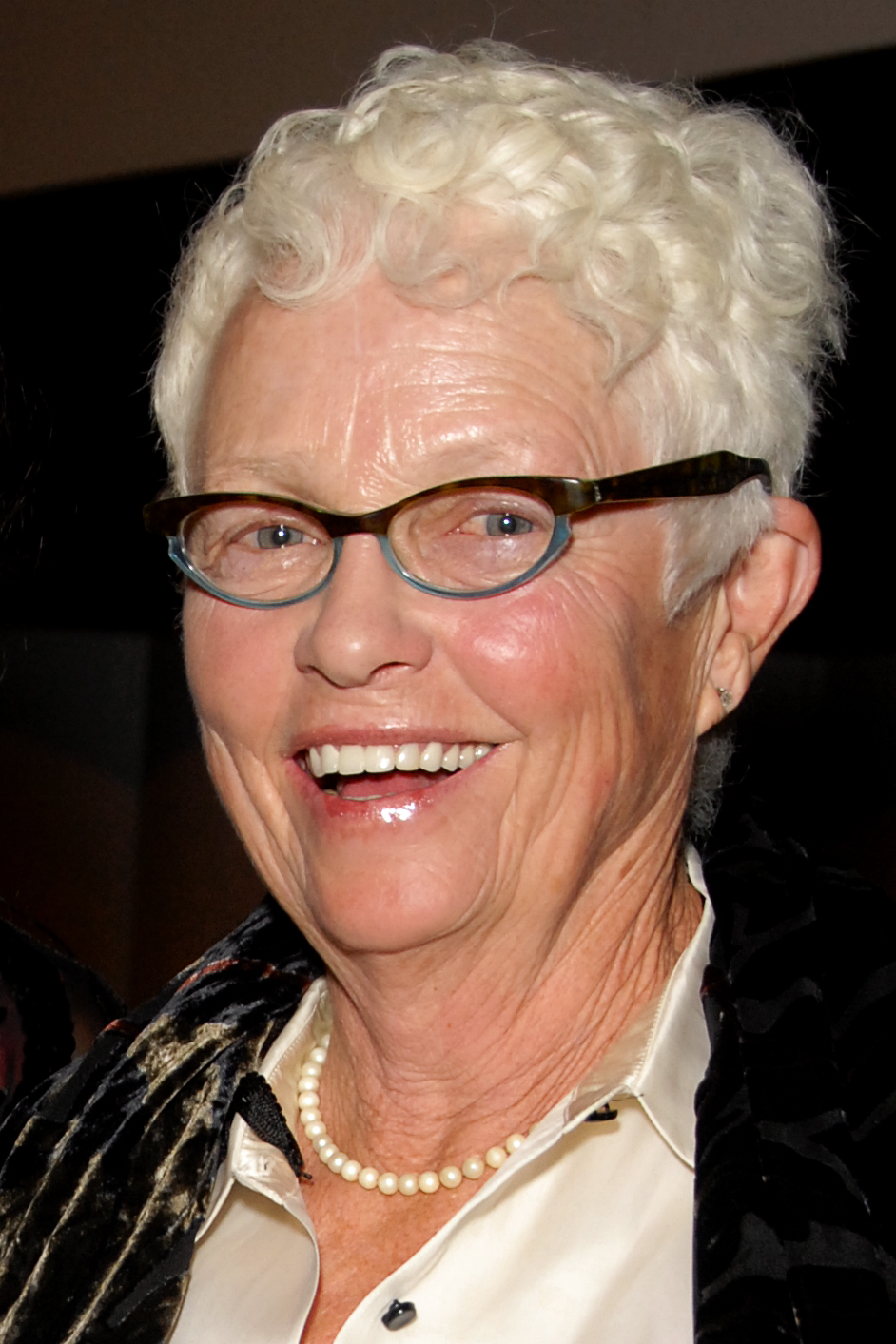
- Randall in 2009
- Born: 18 May 1946 (age 80); Worcester, England
- Occupations: Model; photographer; pornographer
- Spouse: Humphry Knipe (m. 1975; died 2023)
- Children: 3, including Holly

Suze Randall (born 18 May 1946) is an English model, photographer, and pornographer. After giving up modelling, she devoted her time to erotic photography and became the first woman to shoot Page 3 for The Sun newspaper. She was the first female staff photographer for both Playboy and Hustler. Randall is one of the early female pornographic film directors; she made Kiss and Tell in 1980. She is the president of adult content website Suze Network.

== Career ==
Working first as a nurse and then as a fashion model in the early 1970s, Randall gained attention for erotic photographs she took of her fellow model friends. In 1972, she played an au pair in Éric Rohmer's film Love in the Afternoon. She gave up modelling and devoted her time to erotic photography, becoming the first female to shoot Page 3 for The Sun newspaper. After working for years for top adult magazines such as Penthouse and Playboy, she continued her career as a freelance photographer. In recent years, her work has included bondage imagery.

Her breakthrough came when she spotted the pinup model Lillian Müller and photographed her for Playboy. Müller was chosen as Playmate of the Month in August 1975 and subsequently Playmate of the Year in 1976. In a pictorial in Playboy's May 1976 issue, Randall was both photographer and model. She went on to shoot a much more explicit self-portrait in a June 1977 Hustler pictorial.

Randall was staff photographer from 1975 until 1977 for Playboy under the supervision of the magazine's West Coast editor, Marilyn Grabowski, and from 1977 until 1979 staff photographer for Hustler. Later, she provided Penthouse Pet feature photo layouts.

Randall has shot album covers for recording artists including Revenge and Robert Palmer, a music video for Capitol Records, and also has photographed the imagery for the British Lamb's Navy Rum calendar.

In 2005, she received the NightMoves Lifetime Achievement Award.

In 2025, she was inducted into the Adult Social Network (ASN) Lifestyle Magazine Hall of Fame.

== Personal life ==
In the 1970s Randall married writer Humphry Knipe, who helped write her biographical book Suze (1977), wrote and directed several of her films as Victor Nye, and managed Suze Randall Productions websites. They had three children together, including erotic photographer Holly Randall (born 1978).
