= Rashida Jones =

American actress (born 1976)

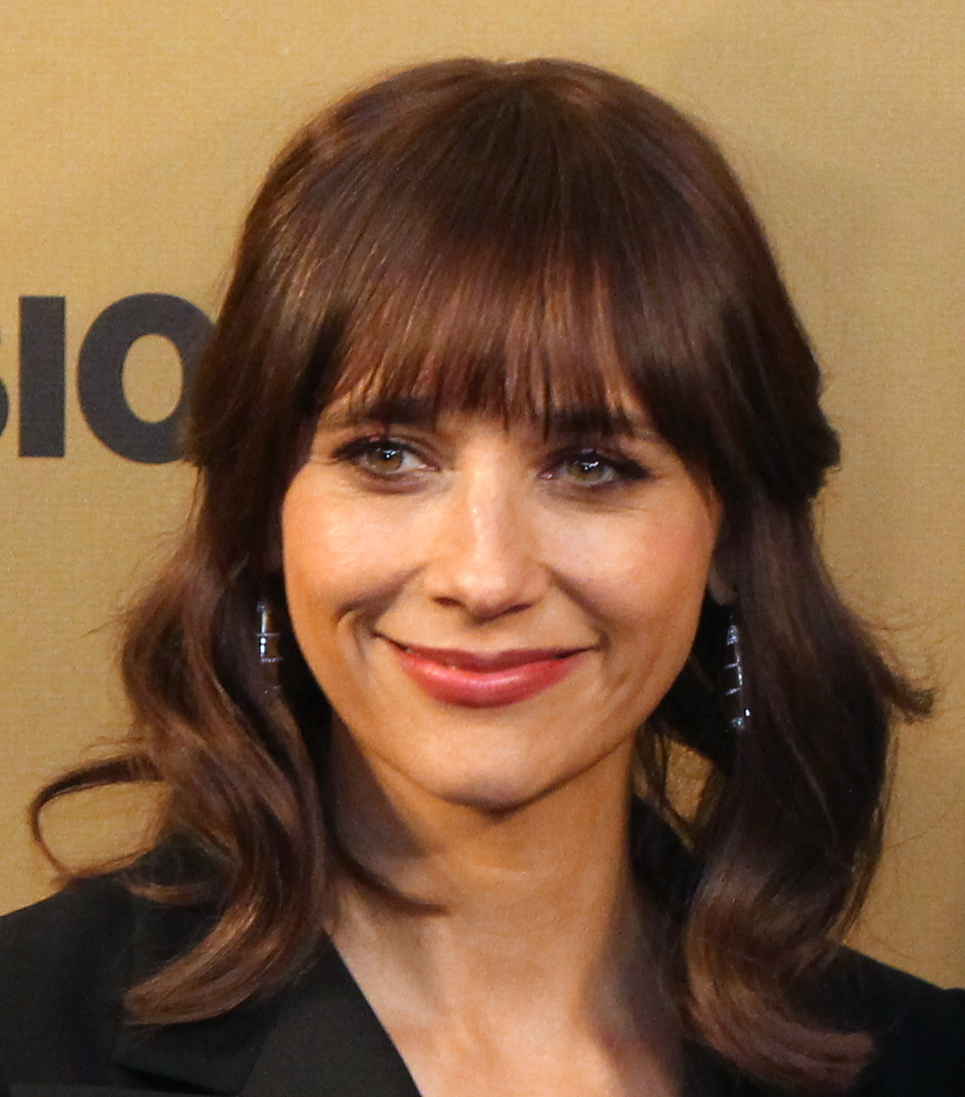
- Jones at the 2017 Peabody Awards
- Born: Rashida Leah Jones; February 25, 1976 (age 50); Los Angeles, California, U.S.
- Education: Harvard University (AB)
- Occupations: Actress; filmmaker
- Years active: 1997–present
- Works: Full list
- Partner: Ezra Koenig (2015–present)
- Children: 1
- Parents: Quincy Jones; Peggy Lipton
- Relatives: Harold Lipton (grandfather); Kidada Jones (sister); Quincy Jones III (half-brother); Kenya Kinski-Jones (half-sister); Richard A. Jones (uncle)

Rashida Leah Jones (/rəˈʃiːdə/ rə-SHEE-də; born February 25, 1976) is an American actress and filmmaker. In television, she has starred as Louisa Fenn on the Fox drama series Boston Public (2000–2002), Karen Filippelli on the NBC comedy series The Office (2006–2009; 2011), Ann Perkins on the NBC comedy series Parks and Recreation (2009–2015), and as the eponymous lead role in the TBS comedy series Angie Tribeca (2016–2019). Her accolades include a Grammy Award win and nominations for a Golden Globe Award and two Primetime Emmy Awards. In 2025, she was named one of Time's 100 most influential people in the world.

Jones also appeared in the films I Love You, Man (2009), The Social Network (2010), Our Idiot Brother (2011), The Muppets (2011), Celeste and Jesse Forever (2012) which she co-wrote, and Tag (2018). Jones also co-wrote the story of Toy Story 4 (2019).

She worked as a producer on the film Hot Girls Wanted (2015) and the series Hot Girls Wanted: Turned On (2017), directing the first episode of the latter. Both works explore the sex industry. In 2018, her documentary Quincy, about her father, Quincy Jones, debuted on Netflix. It won the Grammy Award for Best Music Film in 2019. In 2025, Jones starred in the Black Mirror episode "Common People", earning a nomination for Outstanding Lead Actress in a Limited or Anthology Series or Movie at the 77th Primetime Emmy Awards.

== Early life and education ==
Rashida Leah Jones was born on February 25, 1976 in Los Angeles to actress Peggy Lipton and musician/record producer Quincy Jones. She is the younger sister of actress and model Kidada Jones. Jones also has five half-siblings from her father's other relationships, including Kenya Jones and Quincy Jones III. Jones's father had Tikar roots from Cameroon and a Welsh paternal grandfather. Her mother had Ashkenazi Jewish roots, and her great-great-grandfather escaped Latvia to avoid military service before his family were killed in the Holocaust. Her maternal grandfather, Harold Lipton, a corporate lawyer and owner of the Boston Celtics and San Diego Clippers, changed his surname from Lipschitz to Lipton in the 1930s.

Jones and her sister were raised in Reform Judaism by their mother; Jones attended Hebrew school, but left at the age of ten and did not have a bat mitzvah. Jones's first name derives from the Arabic word for "righteous". Jones grew up in Los Angeles's Bel Air neighborhood. She has said of her parents' mixed-race marriage: "it was the 1970s and still not that acceptable for them to be together". In his autobiography, her father recalled that he often found the six-year-old Jones under the covers after bedtime, reading five books at a time with a flashlight. She has said that she grew up a "straight-up nerd" and "had a computer with floppy disks and a dial-up modem before it was cool". Jones displayed musical ability from an early age and plays classical piano. In 1990, her mother told Entertainment Tonight that Jones was "also a fabulous singer and songwriter".

Jones attended The Buckley School in Sherman Oaks, California, where she made the National Honor Society and was voted "Most Likely To Succeed" by her classmates. Jones was involved with theater at Buckley, with tutelage from acting teacher Tim Hillman. Jones's parents divorced when she was 14 years old; her sister remained with their father, while Rashida moved with their mother to Brentwood. In 1994, Jones garnered attention with an open letter responding to scathing remarks rapper Tupac Shakur made about her parents' marriage in The Source. Shakur later apologized for these remarks and became friends with Jones and her family. Jones's sister, Kidada, was dating Tupac at the time of his death.

Rashida attended Harvard University, where she lived in Currier House and Eliot House. She belonged to the Hasty Pudding Theatricals, the Harvard Radcliffe Dramatic Club, the Harvard Opportunes, the Black Students Association, and the Signet Society. She was initially interested in becoming a lawyer but changed her mind after becoming disillusioned by the O. J. Simpson murder case. She became involved in the performing arts and served as musical director for the Opportunes, an a cappella group, co-composed the score for the 149th annual Hasty Pudding Theatricals performance, and acted in several plays. In her second year at college, Jones performed in For Colored Girls Who Have Considered Suicide / When the Rainbow Is Enuf, which she said was "healing" because she had been seen by many black students as not "black enough". She studied religion and philosophy and graduated in 1997.

== Career ==
=== 1998–2008: Early work and The Office ===
Jones appeared in the 1997 miniseries adaptation of Mario Puzo's novel, The Last Don. She next appeared in Myth America, East of A and If These Walls Could Talk 2. In 2000, she guest-starred as Karen Scarfolli on Freaks and Geeks before landing the role of Louisa Fenn on Boston Public. Jones has been published in Teen Vogue magazine, where she worked as a contributing editor. She wrote chapter 36 of her father's biography, Q: The Autobiography of Quincy Jones (2001). Jones created Frenemy of the State, a comic book series about a socialite who is recruited by the CIA. The comics are published by Oni Press and co-written with husband-and-wife writing team Nunzio DeFilippis and Christina Weir. Between 2000 and 2002, she appeared in 26 episodes of Boston Public, earning an NAACP Image Award nomination in her final year. Although she had a minor supporting role in the series, film opportunities quickly surfaced. She had a small role in Full Frontal, directed by Steven Soderbergh, and starred in Now You Know, written and directed by Kevin Smith regular Jeff Anderson. She also starred in the short film Roadside Assistance with Adam Brody. After Jones left Boston Public, she appeared in Death of a Dynasty, directed by Damon Dash, and two episodes of Chappelle's Show on Comedy Central.

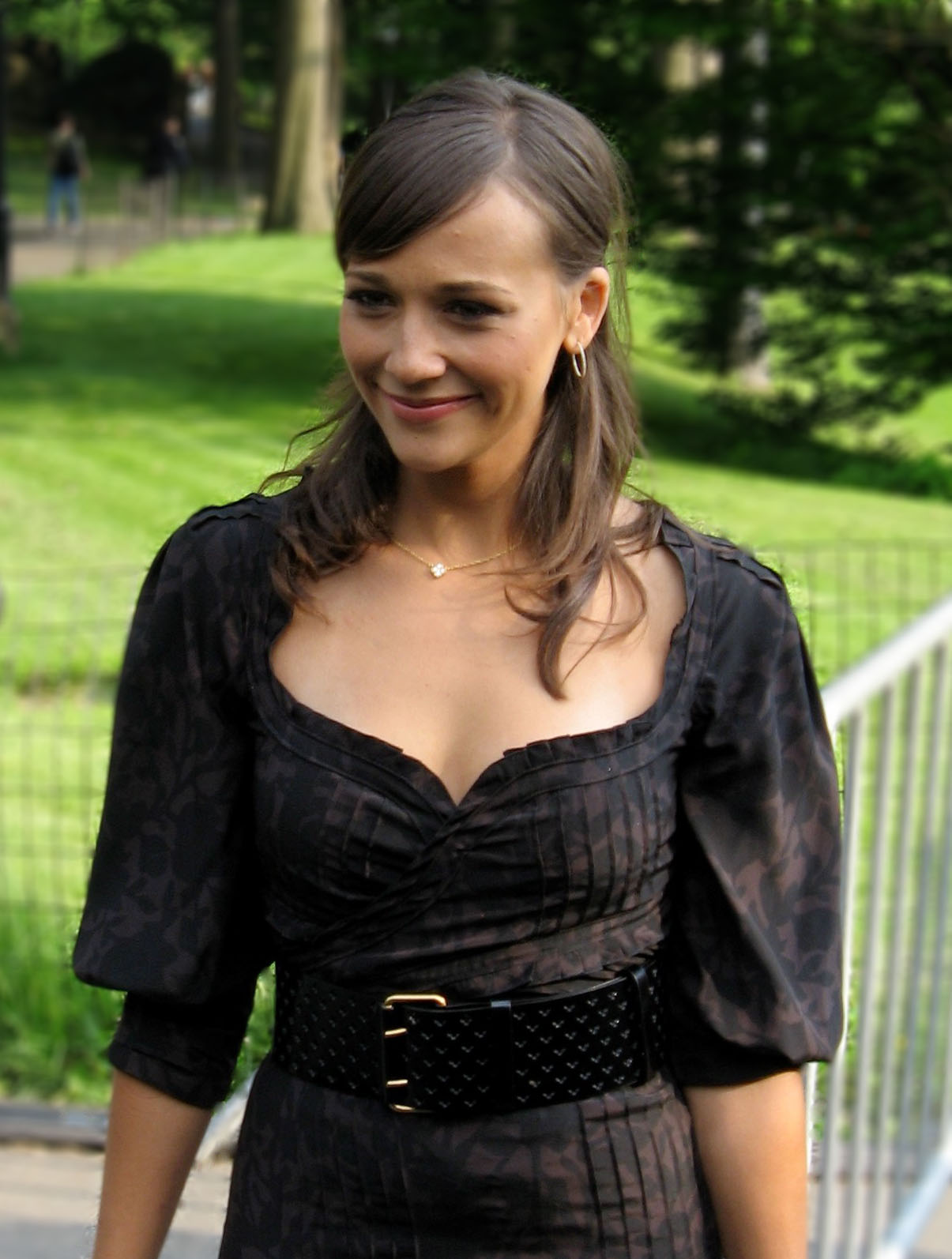
Jones at the 2007 Fox Television Upfronts

In 2004, she was cast in Strip Search, an HBO film directed by Sidney Lumet, but her scenes were cut from the final broadcast version. Later that year, she played Dr. Rachel Keyes in Little Black Book and starred as Edie Miller in the British drama series NY-LON. In 2005, Jones played Karen in the Stella pilot on Comedy Central and special government agent Carla Merced in the TNT police drama Wanted. Jones was considering leaving the acting profession and pursuing a graduate degree in public policy before she was offered the part on The Office. She joined the ensemble cast in September 2006, playing the role of Karen Filippelli. She appeared regularly during the third season, returning as a guest star for three episodes in seasons four, five, and six. Jones also played Karen in the February 2007 Saturday Night Live episode hosted by Rainn Wilson, appearing briefly in the opening monologue's Office parody. Jones filmed cameo roles in The Ten and Role Models, both directed by David Wain, with the latter appearing on the Blu-ray release. She co-starred in Unhitched, the short-lived 2008 comedy series produced by the Farrelly brothers. She also appeared as the love interest in the Foo Fighters' music video "Long Road to Ruin".

In January 2009, Jones voiced several characters in an episode of the Adult Swim show Robot Chicken. She played Hannah in Brief Interviews with Hideous Men, an independent film by John Krasinski that screened during the 2009 Sundance Film Festival. She co-starred as Zooey Rice in I Love You, Man, a DreamWorks comedy with Paul Rudd and Jason Segel. Jones has appeared in several online comedy series projects. She starred in Funny or Die's Speak Out series with Natalie Portman and guest-starred in two episodes in the first web season of Web Therapy with Lisa Kudrow. Due to other commitments, Jones was unable to reprise her role for the second, third, fourth or fifth web seasons; though she provided voiceover work for an off-screen appearance in 2011 during the show's first TV season (containing her appearance from the first web season), and was able to make time to reprise her role on-screen for an exclusive appearance in the second season finale of the show in 2012. She also reprised her role in the sixth web season, which was carried over to the fourth TV season. She also played David Wain in disguise for an episode of My Damn Channel's Wainy Days. In 2008, Jones appeared with several other celebrities in Prop 8 – The Musical, an all-star video satirising California's anti-gay marriage initiative, written by Marc Shaiman.

=== 2009–2014: Parks and Recreation and film roles ===
Jones accepted a role in Parks and Recreation, a mockumentary-style sitcom on NBC. The show was created by Greg Daniels and Michael Schur, with whom she previously worked on The Office. She played nurse Ann Perkins from the show's debut until midway through the sixth season, and reprised the role for the final episode of the series. In October 2009, before the first issue of Frenemy of the State had been released, Jones sold the screen rights to Universal Pictures and Imagine Entertainment. Brian Grazer and Eric Gitter produced the film, and Jones co-wrote the screenplay with writing partner Will McCormack.

Jones had a small role in the 2010 Kevin Smith film Cop Out. She also appeared in The Social Network (2010), alongside Jesse Eisenberg and Andrew Garfield, which is set at Harvard. She played Marylin Delpy, a second-year legal associate assisting with the defense of Facebook founder Mark Zuckerberg. Jones starred opposite Chris Messina in Monogamy (2010), a drama directed by Dana Adam Shapiro. The film premiered at the Tribeca Film Festival in April 2010 and was released theatrically in March 2011.

Jones's other 2011 films were Friends with Benefits, starring Justin Timberlake and Mila Kunis; The Big Year, with Steve Martin, Owen Wilson, and Jack Black; The Muppets, with Jason Segel, Amy Adams, and Chris Cooper; and Our Idiot Brother, with Paul Rudd, Elizabeth Banks, and Emily Mortimer. In the latter she played a lesbian lawyer named Cindy, the caring girlfriend of a bisexual character played by Zooey Deschanel. Jones also has a cameo in the Beastie Boys' short film Fight For Your Right Revisited, which premiered at the 2011 Sundance Film Festival. Additionally, Jones appeared on an episode of Wilfred as Lisa, a hospice volunteer. The episode aired on July 21, 2011, on FX.

Jones sold her first screenplay, a comedy titled Celeste and Jesse Forever, in March 2009. She co-wrote the script with McCormack and was attached to star in the film. It was released in 2012 and she starred in it opposite Andy Samberg. Along with Danny DeVito, she was a voice guest star in The Simpsons episode "The Changing of the Guardian" (season 24, episode 11). From 2013 to 2015, she provided the voice of Hotwire on the Hulu comedy series The Awesomes. In 2014, Jones was cast in the lead role of Angie Tribeca on the TBS comedy series Angie Tribeca, which premiered in 2016. The show was created by Steve and Nancy Carell and was cancelled in 2019.

=== 2015–present: Career expansion ===
In 2015, Jones produced the documentary film Hot Girls Wanted, which examines the role of teenage girls in pornographic films. Netflix acquired the film after its debut at Sundance Film Festival; it premiered on May 29, 2015. A spin-off series, Hot Girls Wanted: Turned On, was released in 2017; Jones was a producer and directed the first episode. Jones is due to be involved in an adaptation of Sell/Buy/Date, a play about the sex industry. Through her involvement in Hot Girls Wanted, Jones garnered a negative reputation among sex workers, as they see the film and series as unfairly depicting the industry and as violating performers' consent. Turned On was criticized after some people who appeared in it said that they did not give permission or withdrew permission, and that the series included their images or personal details without consent.

In 2016, Jones co-wrote the teleplay of "Nosedive", an episode of the television anthology series Black Mirror with Michael Schur from a story by Charlie Brooker. Jones contributed a "thank-you note" to Michelle Obama in The New York Times in 2016 which was excerpted in the 2017 book Courage Is Contagious. In September 2018, Jones's production company, Le Train Train, signed a first-look television deal with MRC.

Jones and McCormack worked on the script of Toy Story 4 for Pixar Animation Studios. Jones left the writing assignment early due to feeling that Pixar is "a culture where women and people of color do not have an equal creative voice". The film was released in June 2019, with the pair being among those receiving a "story by" credit.

Jones voiced the role of Marcy Kappel, a security forces agent of internal affairs, in Blue Sky Studios' animated film Spies in Disguise (2019). In 2020, she starred and served as an executive producer on the Netflix sitcom #blackAF opposite Kenya Barris, who created the series. Jones also voiced the recurring role of Mia on Fox's Duncanville. She starred in the 2020 comedy-drama On the Rocks, opposite Bill Murray, which was directed by Sofia Coppola. Jones co-wrote the pilot episode of the Hulu mystery thriller series The Other Black Girl, a television adaptation of the 2021 novel by Zakiya Dalila Harris. She is also an executive producer on the series. The series premiered on September 13, 2023. On December 12, 2024, it was announced that Jones is writing a script for an animated Tom and Jerry feature film along with Will McCormack and Michael Govier.

== Other ventures ==
=== Music videos ===
As a singer, Jones has provided backing vocals for the band Maroon 5. She appears on the tracks "Tangled", "Secret", and "Not Coming Home" from their debut record, Songs About Jane, and on "Kiwi" from the follow-up album It Won't Be Soon Before Long. Jones was a guest vocalist on the Tupac Shakur tribute album, The Rose That Grew from Concrete, released in 2000. The track, "Starry Night", also featured her father's vocals, Mac Mall's rapping, and her half-brother QD3's production. Jones also contributed vocals on the song "Dick Starbuck: Porno Detective" on The High & Mighty's 1999 debut Home Field Advantage.

Jones contributed vocals to songs on The Baxter, The Ten and Reno 911!: Miami soundtracks. She sang in some episodes of Boston Public and for charitable events such as the What A Pair Benefit in 2002 to raise money for breast cancer research. In May 2015, Jones released a song titled Wanted to Be Loved alongside Daniel Ahearn, the song was used in the documentary Hot Girls Wanted, which Jones produced.

In 2001, Jones appeared in the video to "More Than a Woman" by Aaliyah alongside her sister Kidada Jones and then-boyfriend Mark Ronson; the video was released in January 2002, five months after Aaliyah's death. Jones has also appeared in music videos for The Boy Least Likely To song "Be Gentle With Me", and the Foo Fighters' single "Long Road to Ruin". In the latter she was credited as Racinda Jules and played the role of Susan Belfontaine. In 2013, Jones directed the music video for Sara Bareilles' song "Brave". It marked her debut as a director.

In 2016, she featured in the music video "Flip and Rewind" by Boss Selection, with the video directed by Jones and McCormack.

=== Modeling and advertising ===
Jones appeared as part of the ensemble in a series of musical television commercials for the clothing retailer The Gap, in the nineties.

In 2011, Dove selected Jones as its spokeswoman for its Dove Nourishing Oil Care Collection. In 2015, she began starring in a series of commercials for Verizon FiOS. In 2017, Jones became a spokeswoman for the Almay brand of cosmetics. In 2018, Jones became the first female ambassador for Maison Kitsune. She has promoted the eyeglasses brand, Zenni Optical, provided voiceovers for Southwest Airlines and Expedia commercials, and has appeared in Expedia television commercials.

During the February 2022 Super Bowl LVI, she appeared alongside Tommy Lee Jones, Leslie Jones, and Nick Jonas in a Toyota commercial for the Tundra pickup truck titled "Keeping Up with the Joneses", scored to "It's Not Unusual" by Tom Jones. In July 2022, Jones was featured in the Citi TV spot, "Massage Chair".

=== Podcasting ===
In November 2020, Jones started the Bill Gates and Rashida Jones Ask Big Questions podcast with co-host Bill Gates. In December 2020, the podcast ended after its fifth episode.

== Personal life ==
=== Beliefs and identity ===
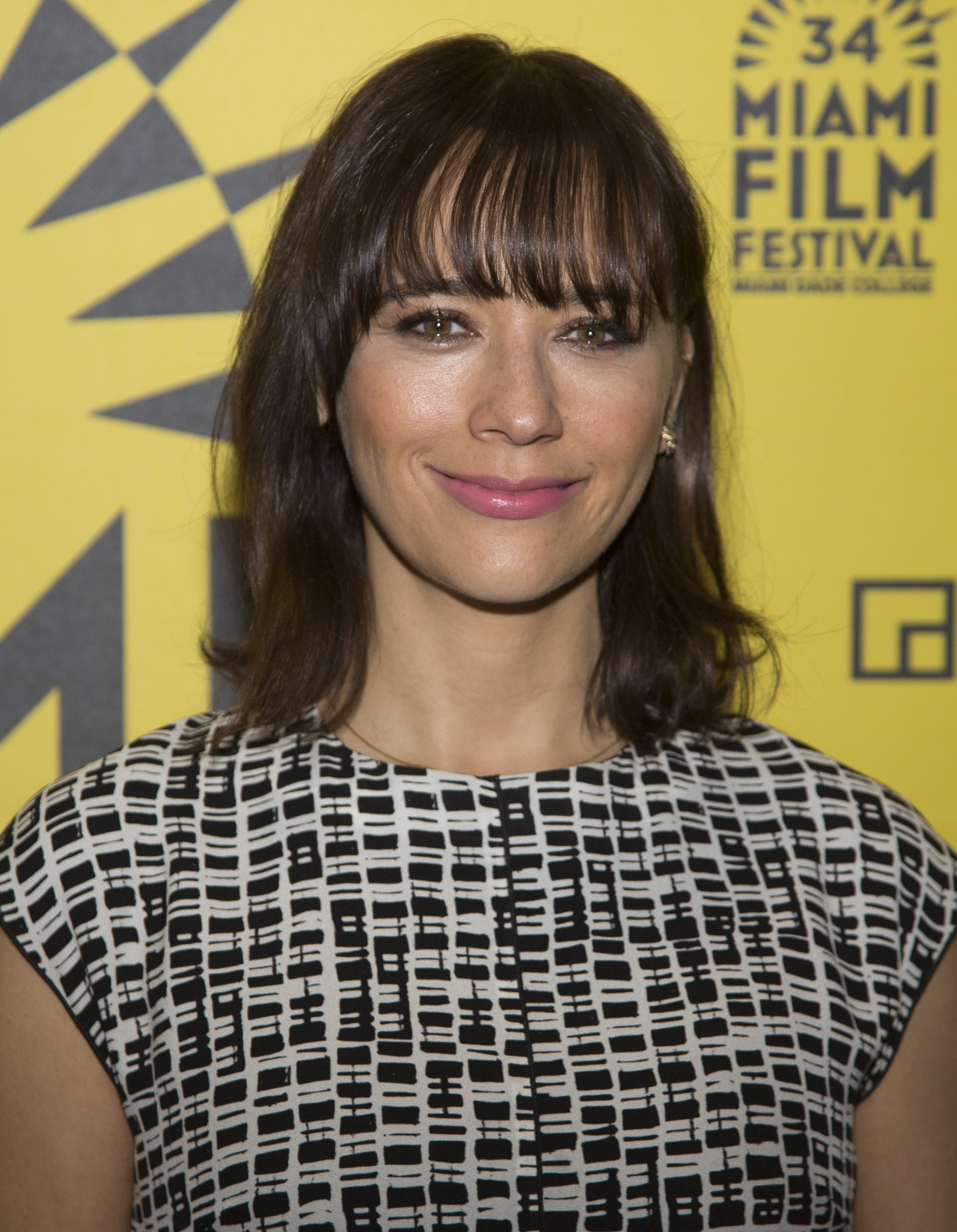
Jones in 2017

Although raised Jewish, Jones began practicing Hinduism in her early teens with her mother, after the two visited an ashram in India. As an adult, she practices Judaism. She told a reporter:

In this day and age, you can choose how you practice and what is your relationship with God. I feel pretty strongly about my connection, definitely through the Jewish traditions and the things that I learned dating the guy that I dated. My boyfriends tend to be Jewish and also be practicing ... I don't see it as a necessity, but there's something about it that I connect with for whatever reason.

On her multi-racial identity, she has remarked, "I have gone through periods where I only feel black or Jewish. Now I have a good balance." and "The thing is, I do identify with being black, and if people don't identify me that way, that's their issue. I'm happy to challenge people's understanding of what it looks like to be biracial..."

=== Relationships ===
After beginning their relationship in 2001, Jones became engaged to music producer Mark Ronson in February 2003. He proposed on her 27th birthday, using a custom-made crossword puzzle spelling out "Will you marry me?" They ended their relationship approximately one year later.

In early 2017 it was reported that Jones was in a relationship with musician Ezra Koenig, and in August 2018 they had a son. In a 2024 interview published in The Guardian, Koenig referred to Jones as his wife. Regarding Koenig, Jones stated in a 2024 interview in The New Yorker:

"Oh, we’re not married. We just kind of call each other that. But we are what we are, in the eyes of God! My parents only got married when my dad had his first brain aneurysm and my sister was six months old, because of rights stuff. I’m sure we’ll get married at some point, but we basically are."

=== Philanthropy ===
Jones has worked to promote Peace First (formerly Peace Games), a nonprofit that teaches children to resolve conflict without violence. She has been a board member since 2004 and holds several annual benefits to raise money for the organization. Jones has participated in Stand Up to Cancer events, EDUN and ONE: The Campaign to Make Poverty History, and The Art of Elysium's volunteer program, which runs artistic workshops for hospitalized children. In 2007, she was honorary chair of the annual Housing Works benefit, which fights AIDS and homelessness in New York City. She has helped fundraise for St. Jude Children's Research Hospital, the EB Medical Research Foundation, and New York's Lower Eastside Girls Club.

In 2016, Jones visited a Syrian refugee camp in Lebanon. She wrote about the eye-opening experience for Vanity Fair. She also made a virtual reality movie to document her experiences, which appeared on rescue.org.

=== Political views ===
Jones has campaigned for Democratic Party presidential candidates. Jones campaigned for Democratic candidate John Kerry during the 2004 election, speaking at student rallies and a public gallery in Ohio.

She supported Barack Obama during the 2008 and 2012 presidential campaigns. In 2008, along with Kristen Bell, she visited college campuses in Missouri to discuss the candidates and to encourage voter registration for the Democratic Party. In 2012, she campaigned in Iowa along with Parks and Recreation co-star Adam Scott.

== Awards and nominations ==
Organizations	Year	Category	Work	Result	Ref.
Astra Midseason Awards	2026	Best Screenplay	The Invite	Won (Note: Shared with Will McCormack)	
Astra TV Awards	2024	Best Guest Actress in a Drama Series	Silo	Nominated	
Black Reel Awards	2012	Outstanding Screenplay, Adapted or Original	Celeste and Jesse Forever	Nominated	
Black Reel Awards	2012	Outstanding Actress	Celeste and Jesse Forever	Nominated	
Black Reel Awards	2019	Outstanding Emerging Director	Quincy	Nominated	
Black Reel TV Awards	2017	Outstanding Guest Performer in a Comedy Series	Black-ish	Nominated	
Black Reel TV Awards	2018	Outstanding Guest Performer in a Comedy Series	Black-ish	Nominated	
Black Reel TV Awards	2020	Outstanding Directing in a Comedy Series	#blackAF	Nominated	
Black Reel TV Awards	2020	Outstanding Actress in a Comedy Series	#blackAF	Nominated	
Black Reel TV Awards	2024	Outstanding Guest Performance in a Drama Series	Silo	Nominated	
Fargo Film Festival	2025	Best Documentary Short	A Swim Lesson	Won	
Film Independent Spirit Awards	2010	Best First Screenplay	Celeste and Jesse Forever	Nominated	
Golden Globes	2025	Best Actress – Miniseries or Television Film	Black Mirror (episode: "Common People")	Nominated	
Gotham Awards	2026	Best Adapted Screenplay	The Invite	Pending	
Grammy Awards	2019	Best Music Film	Quincy	Won	
Hollywood Film Awards	2010	Ensemble of the Year	The Social Network	Won	
NAACP Image Awards	2002	Outstanding Supporting Actress in a Drama Series	Boston Public	Nominated	
NAACP Image Awards	2013	Outstanding Supporting Actress in a Comedy Series	Parks and Recreation	Nominated	
NAACP Image Awards	2014	Outstanding Supporting Actress in a Comedy Series	Parks and Recreation	Nominated	
NAACP Image Awards	2017	Outstanding Writing in a Motion Picture – Television	Black Mirror (episode: "Nosedive")	Nominated	
NAACP Image Awards	2019	Outstanding Directing in a Motion Picture	Quincy	Nominated	
Primetime Emmy Awards	2015	Exceptional Merit in Documentary Filmmaking	Hot Girls Wanted	Nominated	
Primetime Emmy Awards	2025	Outstanding Lead Actress in a Limited or Anthology Series or Movie	Black Mirror (episode: "Common People")	Nominated	
San Diego Film Critics Society	2010	Best Performance by an Ensemble	The Social Network	Nominated	
Satellite Awards	2020	Best Actress in a Motion Picture – Comedy or Musical	On the Rocks	Nominated	
Time Magazine	2025	100 most influential people	Herself	Honored	
Washington D.C. Area Film Critics Association	2010	Best Ensemble	The Social Network	Nominated	
