= Harold Lipton =

American lawyer (1911–1999)

- Born: Harold Arlen Lipschitz; May 11, 1911; The Bronx, New York, U.S.
- Died: December 30, 1999 (aged 88); Palm Springs, California, U.S.
- Occupations: Lawyer; businessman
- Spouse: Rita Benson
- Children: Peggy Lipton
- Relatives: Rashida Jones (granddaughter); Kidada Jones (granddaughter)

Harold Arlen Lipton (né Lipschitz; May 18, 1911 – December 30, 1999) was an American lawyer and basketball executive. In the 1970s and 1980s, Lipton co-owned the Seattle SuperSonics, the San Diego Clippers, and the Boston Celtics with Irv Levin.

== Life ==
Lipton was born in the Bronx, New York, to Belarusian Jewish immigrants Max Lipschitz, a hosier manufacturer from Slutsk, and Alice "Gussie" Goldfarb from Brest.

He graduated from Harvard Law School in 1934. He was general counsel and director of National General Corporation.

He married Rita Benson (born Rosenberg) in 1941. He was the father of actress Peggy Lipton and grandfather of actresses Rashida Jones and Kidada Jones.
