= A Swim Lesson =

2024 American short documentary film

- Release poster
- Directed by: Rashida Jones; Will McCormack
- Produced by: Nicole Emanuele; Emily Arlook
- Starring: William Marsh
- Cinematography: Alexander Alexandrov
- Edited by: Mo Stoebe
- Production companies: Le Train Train; L.A. Times Studios; POV Shorts
- Release date: September 1, 2024 (Telluride)
- Running time: 21 minutes
- Country: United States
- Language: English

A Swim Lesson is a 2024 American short documentary film directed by Rashida Jones and Will McCormack. The film documents the career of William Marsh, a swim instructor from Los Angeles with decades of experience teaching children how to swim. It had its world premiere on September 1, 2024, at the 51st Telluride Film Festival in Main Program Short Films. It was available for streaming live on November 26 on POV Shorts and L.A. Times Studios.

In December 2024, it was shortlisted for the Best Documentary Short Film at the 97th Academy Awards.

== Summary ==
The film is "an ode to an everyday hero: Bill Marsh, a swim teacher who helps children manage their fears and discover their own power when submerged in an overwhelming unknown".

== Release ==
A Swim Lesson had its world premiere in Main Program, Short Films at the 51st Telluride Film Festival on September 1, 2024. On September 22, 2024, it was screened at 25th Calgary International Film Festival It had its East Coast Premiere at the 32nd Hamptons International Film Festival on October 5, 2024. It was also presented in the Oscar qualifying program in 'Fear Eats the Soul' section of the Bend Film Festival on October 11, and on October 19 in the 33rd Hot Springs Documentary Film Festival in Hot Springs, Arkansas. The film was showcased at the Doc NYC on November 15, 2024, in the Shorts Human Spirit programme. The film had its broadcast premiere on POV on PBS on November 26, streaming via the web and the PBSApp. It was streamed on Documentary+ from December 27, 2024. It was showcased at the 40th Santa Barbara International Film Festival on 6 February 2025 in Doc Shorts.

== Accolades ==
Award	Date	Category	Recipient	Result	Ref.
Calgary International Film Festival	September 29, 2024	Audience Choice Award for Best Short Documentary Film	A Swim Lesson	Won	
Hamptons International Film Festival	October 14, 2024	Audience Award for Best Short Film	A Swim Lesson	Won	
Cinema Eye Honors	9 January 2025	Outstanding Non-Fiction Short	A Swim Lesson	Shortlisted	

== See also ==
- Academy Award for Best Documentary Short Film
- Submissions for Best Documentary Short Academy Award
