= Will McCormack =

American actor, producer, screenwriter and director

- Born: William Joseph McCormack Jr. January 13, 1974 (age 52); Plainfield, New Jersey, U.S.
- Other name: William McCormack
- Education: Trinity College
- Occupations: Actor; Executive producer; Screenwriter; Film director
- Years active: 1996–present
- Partner: Emily Arlook (engaged)
- Children: 2
- Relatives: Bridget Mary McCormack (sister); Mary McCormack (sister)

William Joseph McCormack Jr. (born January 13, 1974) is an American actor, executive producer, screenwriter, and film director. He is best known for his short film If Anything Happens I Love You (2020), which earned him the Academy Award for Best Animated Short Film.

McCormack is also known for writing the screenplay for Celeste and Jesse Forever (2012) and the story for Toy Story 4 (2019), the former of which earned him nominations for the Independent Spirit Award for Best First Screenplay and the Black Reel Award for Outstanding Screenplay, Adapted or Original. He appeared in the television series The Sopranos (1999–2001), Brothers & Sisters (2008–2009), and In Plain Sight (2008–2012), as well as the films American Outlaws (2001), Syriana (2005), and A Wrinkle in Time (2018). He won a Lucille Lortel Award for his role in the off-Broadway one-act play The Long Christmas Ride Home (2003).

== Early life and education ==
McCormack was born on January 13, 1974, in Plainfield, New Jersey, to William Sr. and Norah Magdalene (née Ross; 1942–2024) McCormack. He has two older sisters, Mary, an actress, and Bridget, a Michigan Supreme Court Justice and former University of Michigan law professor. He graduated from Trinity College in Hartford, Connecticut.

== Career ==
McCormack's key television roles include Jason La Penna on The Sopranos (1999–2001). More recently, he played the role of Leo Spiller, brother of lead character Lucy Spiller (Courteney Cox), in the FX series Dirt. He also played a recurring role as the FBI agent in the television drama In Plain Sight, which stars his older sister, Mary.

In 1996, McCormack appeared on Broadway at the Criterion Center Stage Right as a member of the ensemble in a revival of the drama play Summer and Smoke (1948) by Tennessee Williams, produced by The Roundabout Theatre Company. He has also appeared in two Off-Broadway theatre productions, Chinese Friends and The Long Christmas Ride Home. McCormack and Rashida Jones worked on the script of Toy Story 4. They ultimately withdrew from the project in November 2017 and received "story by" credit.

== Personal life ==
As of 2018, he is engaged to actress Emily Arlook.

== Filmography ==
=== Film and television ===
Year	Title	Role	Notes
1999–2001	The Sopranos	Jason La Penna	Television series
2000	Boiler Room	Mike	
2001	American Outlaws	Bob Younger	
2002	Abandon	August	
2002	A Midsummer Night's Rave	Greg	
2002	The Shield	Steve Hanratty	Television series
2005	Prime	Palmer	
2005	Must Love Dogs	Jason	
2005	Syriana	Willy	
2006	Right at Your Door	Jason	
2006	CSI: NY	Todd Miller	Television series
2007–2008	Dirt	Leo Spiller	Television series
2008	CSI: Crime Scene Investigation	Langston Weller	Television series
2008–2009	Brothers & Sisters	Ethan Tavis	Television series
2008–2012	In Plain Sight	Robert O'Conner	Television series
2011	Paul the Male Matchmaker	Harry	Television series
2011	Alphas	Marcus Ayers	Television series
2012	Celeste and Jesse Forever	Skillz	Also credited as co-screenwriter
2012	Mob City	Gunman	Television series
2013	The Office	Wolf	Television series
2014	Among Ravens	Chad Whitlock	
2018	A Wrinkle in Time	Mr. Teacher	
2019	Toy Story 4	—N/a	story credits with Andrew Stanton, John Lasseter, Josh Cooley, Valerie LaPointe, Rashida Jones, Martin Hynes, Stephany Folsom
2020	If Anything Happens I Love You	—N/a	Director and writer
2024	A Swim Lesson	Director	Documentary Short film
2026	The Invite	—N/a	Co-writer

=== Stage work ===
Year	Title	Genre	Role	Theatre	Location	Notes
1996	Summer and Smoke	drama	Ensemble (member)	Criterion Center Stage Right	New York City, New York	Broadway revival by The Roundabout Theatre Company
2003	The Long Christmas Ride Home	drama	Stephen	Vineyard Theatre	New York City, New York	Off-Broadway; recipient, 2004 Lucille Lortel Award, Outstanding Featured Actor
2004	Chinese Friends		Stephan	Playwrights Horizons	New York City, New York	Off-Broadway

== Awards and nominations ==
Year	Award	Category	Nominated work	Result
2013	13th Black Reel Awards	Best Screenplay, Adapted or Original (shared with Rashida Jones)	Celeste and Jesse Forever	Nominated
2013	28th Independent Spirit Awards	Best First Screenplay (shared with Rashida Jones)	Celeste and Jesse Forever	Nominated
2021	Academy Awards	Best Animated Short	If Anything Happens I Love You	Won
2026	Gotham Independent Film Awards	Best Adapted Screenplay (shared with Rashida Jones)	The Invite	Pending

== See also ==
- Lists of American writers
