= Celeste and Jesse Forever =

2012 American film directed by Lee Toland Krieger

- Theatrical release poster
- Directed by: Lee Toland Krieger
- Written by: Rashida Jones; Will McCormack
- Produced by: Jennifer Todd; Suzanne Todd; Lee Nelson
- Starring: Rashida Jones; Andy Samberg; Chris Messina; Ari Graynor; Eric Christian Olsen; Will McCormack; Elijah Wood; Emma Roberts
- Cinematography: David Lanzenberg
- Edited by: Yana Gorskaya
- Music by: Sunny Levine; Zach Cowie
- Production companies: Envision Media Arts; Team Todd
- Distributed by: Sony Pictures Classics
- Release dates: January 20, 2012 (Sundance); August 3, 2012 (United States)
- Running time: 92 minutes
- Country: United States
- Language: English
- Budget: $840,000
- Box office: $3.6 million

Celeste and Jesse Forever is a 2012 American romantic comedy-drama film directed by Lee Toland Krieger, written by Rashida Jones and Will McCormack, and starring Jones and Andy Samberg alongside Chris Messina, Ari Graynor, Eric Christian Olsen, Will McCormack, Elijah Wood, and Emma Roberts. The film was released on August 3, 2012, in New York City and Los Angeles.

== Plot ==
Celeste and Jesse start dating in high school and eventually marry young. Their relationship is depicted via photo montage, ending with Celeste walking away from Jesse during a party.

Celeste and Jesse get along well. She is a successful trend analyzer and runs her own media company with a business partner, Scott. Celeste's media company has recently signed Riley Banks, a teenage pop star whom Celeste does not respect and had previously insulted during a television interview. Jesse is an unemployed artist in no hurry to find a job.

Celeste decides to separate but promises to remain friends. Jesse agrees, but he is still in love with Celeste and hopes to reconcile. They manage to share a close relationship after their separation. Their connection during the divorce becomes increasingly concerning to their mutual friends, Beth and Tucker. Beth tries to reason with Celeste and Jesse about the odd nature of their arrangement, but Celeste rationalizes that it is better for the two to maintain their friendship. Another mutual friend, Skillz, agrees with Beth and Tucker and maintains that it is time for the two to move on with their lives.

Celeste is initially content with her relationship status until she spends the night with Jesse. Realizing reconciliation is not possible, Jesse decides to leave while ignoring Celeste's apologies. Jesse is able to move on and begins dating Veronica, who later becomes pregnant. Celeste is unhappy about Veronica’s pregnancy and expresses concern to Beth, who wonders if she is having second thoughts with regard to the divorce. To distract herself, Celeste takes up exercising and begins dating other people. While having dinner with her date Max, Celeste runs into Jesse. The encounter becomes awkward for Celeste, but Max and Jesse get along well. Having gone through a divorce before, Max suggests that Celeste is not ready to date and that she should take her time.

Celeste meets Paul in yoga class and responds angrily after he hits on her. After the two meet again at a party, she warms up to Paul and they begin seeing each other. In the meantime, Jesse begins to mature and takes on more responsibility with regard to Veronica and her pregnancy. Celeste ultimately realizes her decision to divorce Jesse was impulsive and selfish and hopes to reunite with him. When she expresses her feelings to Jesse, they fight and leave each other on poor terms.

Celeste later gets a call from her client, Riley, asking her to come over. Celeste initially believes she is upset because of a logo design that sparked unintentional controversy with her tween fanbase. After arriving at Riley's house, she finds her in tears. She admits to Celeste that she has been seeing a man whom she recently discovered cheating on her. They form an unexpected bond over their shared heartbreak and become friends. At a nightclub with Riley, Celeste realizes the questionable logo she designed appeals greatly to Riley's gay fanbase. Celeste recognizes the potential to leverage the logo to make her the next Lady Gaga.

At Beth and Tucker's wedding, Celeste makes an emotional toast, urging the newlyweds to appreciate each other, be patient, and try hard, as she should have done in her own marriage. This speech touches Jesse and he thanks Celeste.

On a karaoke date, Celeste informs Paul of her need to take some time to recover from her divorce, which he understands. Celeste and Jesse finally sign their divorce papers and are able to laugh at each other's inside jokes. Their lawyers look on, confused by this response. Celeste wishes Jesse well and asks if he loves Veronica, to which he responds that he does. Celeste encourages him to keep fighting for his marriage to Veronica and they share one final kiss.

== Cast ==
- Rashida Jones as Celeste Martin
- Andy Samberg as Jesse Abrams
- Elijah Wood as Scott
- Emma Roberts as Riley Banks
- Eric Christian Olsen as Steve Tucker
- Ari Graynor as Beth
- Chris Messina as Paul
- Will McCormack as Skillz
- Rich Sommer as Max
- Chris D'Elia as Snow White
- Rafi Gavron as Rupert Bates
- Matthew Del Negro as Nick Moran
- Chris Pine (as Kris Pino) as Rory Shenandoah
- Janel Parrish as Savannah
- Rebecca Dayan as Veronica

== Reception ==
=== Critical response ===
Celeste and Jesse Forever was screened at the 2012 Sundance Film Festival in January to mostly positive reviews. Rotten Tomatoes gives the film a rating of 71% based on 141 reviews with an average score of 6.36/10. The site's consensus states, "While it doesn't subvert the genre as incisively as it thinks it does, Celeste and Jesse Forever is a shrewd rom-com that benefits from its likable cast and trumpets the arrival of Rashida Jones as a bona fide big screen talent". Metacritic gives the film a score of 59 out of 100, based on reviews from 37 critics.

Owen Gleiberman of Entertainment Weekly gave the film an A− and concluded his review by stating: "I will say that it's been a while since a romantic comedy mustered this much charm by looking this much like life". Roger Ebert was also positive in his review for the Chicago Sun-Times, giving it three-and-a-half out of four. He credited Jones for writing a "sound" screenplay and characters with a regard for their emotions, while calling the film "a good-hearted romantic comedy about a likable couple — so likable, indeed, that it swims upstream against the current of our desires".

=== Accolades ===
Year	Award	Category	Nominee(s)	Result
2013	13th Black Reel Awards	Best Actress	Rashida Jones	Nominated
2013	13th Black Reel Awards	Best Screenplay, Adapted or Original	Rashida Jones and Will McCormack	Nominated
2013	28th Independent Spirit Awards	Best First Screenplay	Rashida Jones and Will McCormack	Nominated
2013	29th Artios Awards	Outstanding Achievement in Casting – Low Budget Feature – Drama/Comedy	Angela Demo	Nominated

== Release ==
Celeste and Jesse Forever was released on DVD and Blu-ray on February 5, 2013.

== Remake ==
An upcoming British remake will be titled Lola and Freddie.
