= Christmas Special (album) =

Studio album by The Boy Least Likely To
- Released: 2010
- Recorded: 2010
- Genre: Twee pop
- Length: 33:08
- Label: Too Young to Die
- Producer: Owen/Hobbs

The Boy Least Likely To chronology
Law of the Playground (2009)	Christmas Special (2010)	The Great Perhaps (2013)

Professional ratings
Review scores
Source	Rating
Slant Magazine	3.5/5 stars
Tiny Mix Tapes	1/5 marks

Christmas Special is a festive album released in 2010 by The Boy Least Likely To. The song "The First Snowflake" was featured in the episode "Adrift and at Peace" from season 7 of Grey's Anatomy.

== Track listing ==
1. "The Christmas Waltz" – 1:42
2. "Happy Christmas Baby" – 3:31
3. "Blue Spruce Needles" – 3:45
4. "Little Donkey" – 2:46
5. "Christmas Isn't Christmas" – 3:14
6. "The Wassail Song" – 1:54
7. "Jingle My Bells" – 1:40
8. "George and Andrew" – 4:01
9. "In The Bleak Midwinter" – 2:14
10. "I Can't Make It Snow" – 3:28
11. "The First Snowflake" – 3:33
