= Quincy (film) =

- Film poster
- Directed by: Alan Hicks; Rashida Jones
- Written by: Alan Hicks; Rashida Jones
- Produced by: Paula DuPré Pesmen
- Starring: Quincy Jones
- Cinematography: Rory Marx Anderson
- Edited by: Andrew McAllister; Will Znidaric
- Production companies: TriBeCa Productions; Quincy Jones Productions
- Distributed by: Netflix
- Release dates: September 9, 2018 (TIFF); September 21, 2018
- Running time: 124 minutes
- Country: United States
- Language: English

Quincy is a 2018 American documentary film about the life of American record producer, composer, arranger, record executive, conductor, trumpeter, film and television producer, and bandleader Quincy Jones. The film was co-written and co-directed by Alan Hicks and Rashida Jones and produced by Paula DuPré Pesmen. The film was released by Netflix on September 21, 2018.

The film won a Grammy Award for Best Music Film at the 2019 Grammy Awards.

== Production ==
The documentary is co-directed by Jones' daughter Rashida Jones and Alan Hicks. It was produced by Paula DuPré Pesmen, and executive produced by Jane Rosenthal and Berry Welsh for TriBeCa Productions and Adam Fell for Quincy Jones Productions. On August 1, 2018, it was announced that Netflix had acquired the documentary film about Quincy Jones.

== Epilogue ==
The film epilogue details his career as follows: "Over 2,900 songs recorded; over 300 albums recorded; 51 film and television scores; over 1,000 original compositions; 79 Grammy nominations; 28 Grammy awards; 1 of 18 EGOT winners (Emmy, Grammy, Oscar, Tony); Thriller the best selling album of all time; We Are the World the best selling single of all time; $63 million raised for famine relief in Africa; and 7 children."

== Release ==
The film had a special screening on September 9, 2018, at the Toronto International Film Festival, at the Princess of Wales Theatre in Toronto, Canada.

Quincy was released on September 21, 2018, on Netflix.

== Reception ==
On the review aggregator website Rotten Tomatoes, 82% of 33 critics' reviews are positive, with an average rating of 6.6/10. The website's consensus reads: "Quincy presents an undeniably entertaining overview of its subject's remarkable life and career, albeit one that may leave some viewers wishing it had dug a little deeper." Metacritic, which uses a weighted average, assigned the film a score of 60 out of 100, based on 11 critics, indicating "mixed or average" reviews.

=== Awards ===
Year	Award	Result	Ref.
2018	AAFCA's Top Ten List (African-American Film Critics Association)	Won	
2018	Critics Choice Documentary Award for Best Music Documentary	Won	
2019	Grammy Award for Best Music Film (61st Annual Grammy Awards)	Won	
2020	Black Reel Award for Outstanding Documentary (Black Reel Awards of 2020)	Won	

== See also ==
- List of black films of the 2010s
