= The Best Party Ever =

Studio album by The Boy Least Likely To
- Released: 14 February 2005
- Recorded: 2004
- Genre: Twee pop
- Length: 37:11
- Label: Too Young to Die
- Producer: Pete Hobbs; Jof Owen

The Boy Least Likely To chronology
The Best Party Ever (2005)	Law of the Playground (2009)

Professional ratings
Review scores
Source	Rating
AllMusic	4/5 stars
Pitchfork	8.5/10
PopMatters	8/10
Rolling Stone	3.5/5 stars
Slant Magazine	4/5 stars

The Best Party Ever is the debut album by British indie pop band The Boy Least Likely To. The album was released on the band's own label Too Young to Die on 14 February 2005 in the United Kingdom, and in April 2006 in the United States.

== Track listing ==
All tracks are written by Pete Hobbs and Jof Owen, except where noted.

No.	Title	Writer(s)	Length
1.	"Be Gentle with Me"		3:52
2.	"Fur Soft as Fur"		3:32
3.	"Monsters"		3:09
4.	"Paper Cuts"		3:20
5.	"Warm Panda Cola"		0:51
6.	"I See Spiders When I Close My Eyes"		4:00
7.	"I'm Glad I Hitched My Apple Wagon to Your Star"		4:20
8.	"The Battle of the Boy Least Likely To"		3:38
9.	"Sleeping with a Gun Under My Pillow"	Owen	3:20
10.	"Hugging My Grudge"		4:06
11.	"My Tiger My Heart"	Owen	2:31
12.	"God Takes Care of the Little Things"	Owen	0:51
