= Peggy Lipton =

American actress (1946–2019)

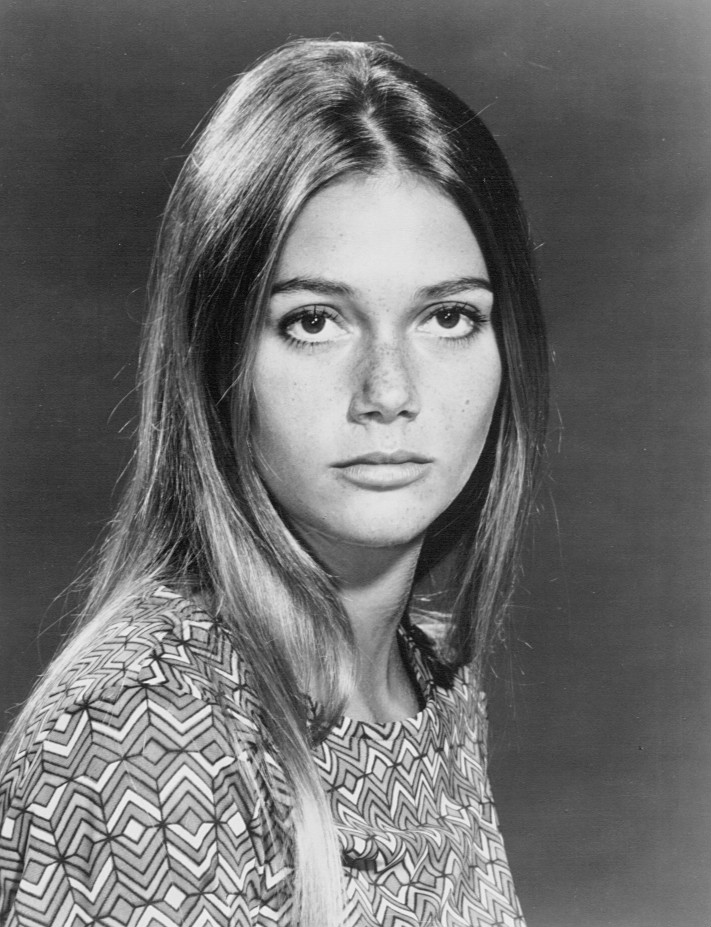
- Lipton in 1968
- Born: Margaret Ann Lipton; August 30, 1946; New York City, U.S.
- Died: May 11, 2019 (aged 72); Los Angeles, California, U.S.
- Occupations: Actress; model; singer
- Years active: 1964–1974; 1988–2017
- Spouse: Quincy Jones (m. 1974; div. 1990)
- Children: Kidada; Rashida
- Father: Harold Lipton

Margaret Ann "Peggy" Lipton (August 30, 1946 – May 11, 2019) was an American model, actress, and singer. She made appearances in many of the most popular television shows of the 1960s before she landed her defining role as flower child Julie Barnes in the crime drama The Mod Squad (1968–1973), for which she was nominated for four Emmy Awards and four Golden Globe Awards, winning the Golden Globe Award for Best Actress in a Television Series – Drama in 1970.

After The Mod Squad, Lipton married musician Quincy Jones and began a 15-year hiatus from acting, during which she raised her two children, Kidada and Rashida Jones. She returned to acting in 1988, performing in many TV roles, including Norma Jennings in David Lynch's surrealist mystery-horror drama Twin Peaks.

== Early life ==
Margaret Ann Lipton was born into an upper middle-class Jewish family in New York City on August 30, 1946, the daughter of artist Rita Benson (born Rita Hetty Rosenberg) and corporate lawyer Harold Lipton. Her paternal grandparents (surnamed Lipschitz) were Jewish immigrants from Russia, and her mother was born in Dublin, Ireland, to Jewish parents from Latvia. Lipton was raised in Lawrence, Nassau County, New York, on Long Island, with her brothers: Robert, who became an actor, and Kenneth. She attended Lawrence High School before transferring to the Professional Children's School. Sexually abused by an uncle, Lipton was a nervous and withdrawn child with a stutter so severe that she was sometimes unable to say her own name. In 1964, the family moved to Los Angeles, where Lipton became what she called a "Topanga Canyon hippie" who explored meditation and yoga.

== Career ==
=== Modeling and acting ===
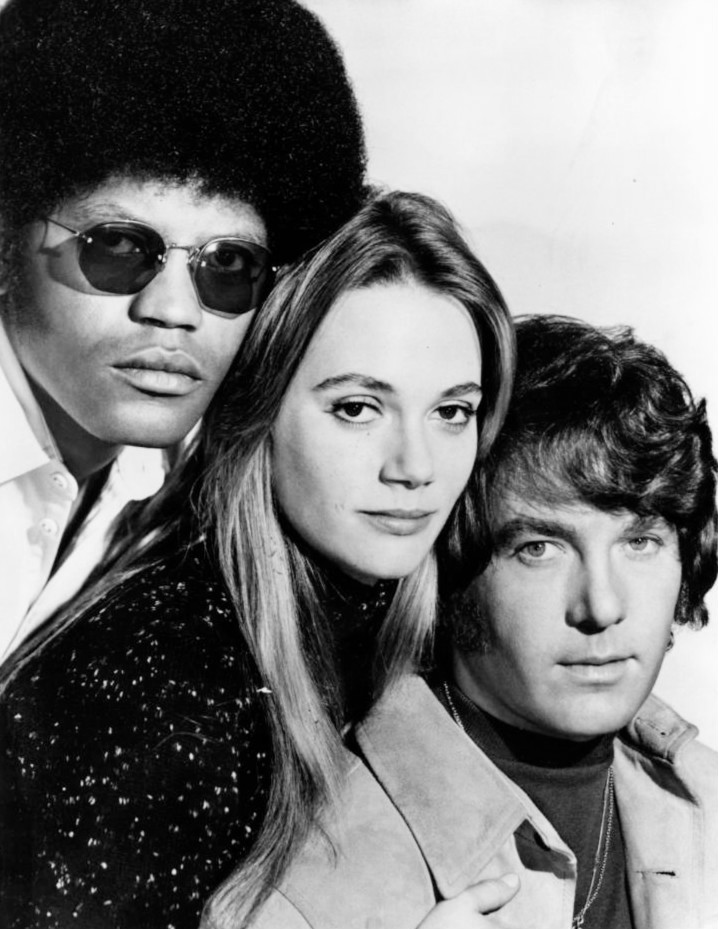
The Mod Squad main cast in 1971 from left: Clarence Williams III, Lipton and Michael Cole

Lipton's father arranged her first modeling jobs in New York, while her mother encouraged her to take acting lessons. At 15, Lipton became a Ford Agency model and enjoyed a successful early career. After she and her family moved to Los Angeles in 1964, Lipton signed a contract with Universal Pictures. She made her television debut at age 19 in the NBC sitcom The John Forsythe Show (1965). Between 1965 and 1968, she appeared in episodes of Bewitched, The Virginian, The Invaders, The Road West, The F.B.I., The Alfred Hitchcock Hour, and Mr. Novak.

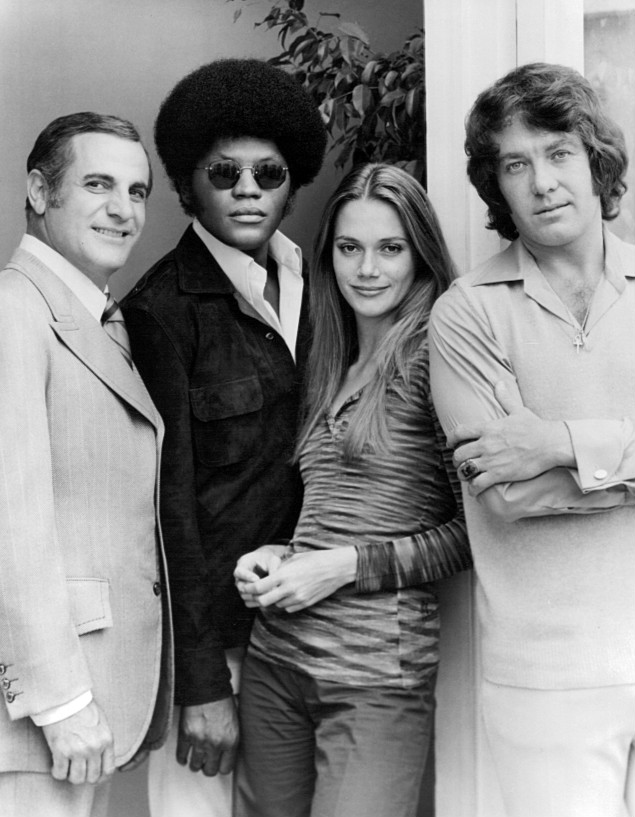
Peggy Lipton with fellow Mod Squad cast members Tige Andrews, Clarence Williams III, and Michael Cole.

Lipton starred in The Mod Squad as one of a trio of Los Angeles undercover "hippie cops". Appearing waiflike and vulnerable, as David Hutchings wrote, her performance as "canary with a broken wing" Julie Barnes earned her four Emmy Award nominations and four Golden Globe Award nominations during her tenure. In 1971, she won a Golden Globe Award for Best TV Actress in a Drama. Thin with long, straight, ash blonde hair, clad in mini-skirts, bell bottoms, and love beads, Lipton's Julie Barnes became a fashion icon and the hip "it girl" of her time.

After The Mod Squad, Lipton did no full-time acting for 15 years (with the exception of appearing in the made-for-TV movie The Return of the Mod Squad in 1979). In March 1988, she returned to television as the star of an ABC movie, Addicted to His Love. She eventually regained major attention for her performance as Norma Jennings in David Lynch's TV series Twin Peaks (1990–1991), and subsequently appeared in many TV shows, including recurring roles in Crash and Popular. In 2017 she reprised her character of Norma Jennings in the Twin Peaks revival. Also in 2017, she appeared in an episode of Angie Tribeca as the mother of the title character played by her daughter Rashida Jones.

=== Singing ===
As a singer, three of Lipton's singles landed on the Billboard charts: "Stoney End" (No. 121 Bubbling Under Hot 100, 1968, later a Top Ten hit for Barbra Streisand in 1970) and "Lu" (1970), both written by Laura Nyro. Her "Wear Your Love Like Heaven" (1970) was written by Donovan. "Stoney End" is included in her 1968 album Peggy Lipton (Ode Records), which was released on CD on July 29, 2014, by RealGone Music, along with other singles and previously unreleased material (nineteen tracks in all).

Lipton and her husband Quincy Jones, along with Alan and Marilyn Bergman, co-wrote the 1984 Frank Sinatra hit, "L.A. Is My Lady".

== Personal life ==
At the age of 18, Lipton began using drugs in an attempt to alleviate her depression. She was briefly linked with Paul McCartney, whom she met in August 1964, when she was 17 and he was 22. After Lipton married musician and producer Quincy Jones in 1974, she took a hiatus from acting to concentrate on her family. The couple had two daughters, Kidada (born 1974) and Rashida (born 1976), who both became actresses. Lipton and Jones separated in 1986, and divorced in 1990.

== Death ==
After being diagnosed in 2004, Lipton died of colon cancer in Los Angeles on May 11, 2019, at the age of 72.

== Discography ==
- 1968 Peggy Lipton (Ode Records)
- 2013 Peggy Lipton: The Complete Ode Recordings (Vivid Sound)

=== Singles ===
- 1968 "Wear Your Love Like Heaven" b/w "Honey Won't Let Me" (45 rpm) (Record World AC #40)
- 1968 "Stoney End" b/w "San Francisco Glide" (45 rpm) (Billboard No. 121)
- 1969 "Red Clay County Line" b/w "Just A Little Lovin' (Early In The Morning)" (45 rpm)
- 1970 "Lu" / "Let Me Pass By" (45 rpm) (#45 Canada, February 1970)
- 1970 "Let Me Pass By" b/w "Hands Off the Man (Flim Flam Man)" (45 rpm)

== Filmography ==
=== Film ===
| Year | Title | Role | Notes |
|---|---|---|---|
| 1968 | Blue | Laurie Kramer | |
| 1988 | War Party | TV correspondent | |
| 1988 | Purple People Eater | Mom | |
| 1989 | Kinjite: Forbidden Subjects | Kathleen Crowe | |
| 1990 | Fatal Charm | Jane Sims | Video |
| 1991 | True Identity | Rita | |
| 1992 | Twin Peaks: Fire Walk with Me | Norma Jennings | |
| 1997 | The Postman | Ellen March | |
| 2000 | The Intern | Roxanne Rochet | |
| 2000 | Skipped Parts | Laurabel Pierce | |
| 2001 | Jackpot | Janice | |
| 2010 | When in Rome | Priscilla | |
| 2017 | A Dog's Purpose | Adult Hannah | Final film role |

=== Television ===
| Year | Title | Role | Notes |
|---|---|---|---|
| 1965 | Bewitched | Secretary | "Your Witch Is Showing" |
| 1965 | Mr. Novak | Selma | "And Then I Wrote..." |
| 1965 | The Alfred Hitchcock Hour | Mary Winters | "Night Fever" |
| 1965 | The John Forsythe Show | Joanna | "Super Girl" |
| 1966 | The Virginian | Dulcie Colby | "The Wolves Up Front, the Jackals Behind" |
| 1967 | Walt Disney's Wonderful World of Color | Oralee Prentiss | "Willie and the Yank: The Deserter", "Willie and the Yank: The Mosby Raiders" |
| 1967 | Bob Hope Presents the Chrysler Theatre | Jill | "A Song Called Revenge" |
| 1967 | The Road West | Jenny Grimmer | "Elizabeth's Oddyssey" |
| 1967 | The Invaders | Bride | "Wall of Crystal" |
| 1968–1973 | The Mod Squad | Julie Barnes | Main role: 123 episodes |
| 1969 | The Andy Williams Show | Herself | 1 episode |
| 1971 | The Dick Cavett Show | Herself | 1 episode |
| 1979 | The Return of the Mod Squad | Julie Barnes | TV film |
| 1990 | The Hitchhiker | Helen | "Working Girl" |
| 1990 | The Tonight Show Starring Johnny Carson | Herself | 1 episode |
| 1990–1991 | Twin Peaks | Norma Jennings | Main role: 30 episodes |
| 1992 | Secrets | Olivia Owens | TV miniseries |
| 1993 | Angel Falls | Hadley Larson | Main role |
| 1994 | The Spider and the Fly | Helen Stroud | TV film |
| 1994 | Deadly Vows | Nancy Weston | TV film |
| 1994 | Wings | Miss Laurie Jenkins | "Miss Jenkins" |
| 1996 | Justice for Annie: A Moment of Truth Movie | Carol Mills | TV film |
| 2000 | The 70s | Gloria Steinem | TV film |
| 2000 | Popular | Kelly Foster | Recurring role |
| 2004 | Alias | Olivia Reed | Recurring role |
| 2005 | Cuts | Marsha | "The Turkey Triangle" |
| 2007 | Rules of Engagement | Fay | "A Visit from Fay" |
| 2009 | Crash | Susie | Recurring role |
| 2012 | House of Lies | Phoebe Van Der Hooven | "Prologue and Aftermath" |
| 2014 | Psych | Scarlett Jones | "1967: A Psych Odyssey" |
| 2016–2017 | Angie Tribeca | Peggy Tribeca | 2 episodes |
| 2017 | Twin Peaks | Norma Jennings | 5 episodes |
| 2017 | Claws | Peggy Lipton | "Self-Portrait" |
| 2017 | There's... Johnny! | Evelyn Greenfield | "Owed to Joy" |

== See also ==
- List of show business families
