= Captain Phoenix =

English indie pop rock band

- Origin: London, England
- Genres: Indie pop, pop rock
- Years active: 2004–2009
- Label: Kind Canyon Records (UK)
- Members: Ben Burrows; Luke Keyte; Nick Hill; Ross Curnow
- Website: www.captainphoenix.com

Captain Phoenix were an English indie pop rock band, from London, originally from Winchester, Hampshire. The band consisted of singer and bassist Ben Burrows, lead guitarist Luke Keyte, guitarist Nick Hill, and drummer Ross Curnow.

== History ==
Captain Phoenix were a London based indie rock band, originally from Winchester. The band formed in 2004 before signing to indie label Kind Canyon. They have since released four singles:- "Living On The Guestlist", "Pistols And Hearts" (no. 29 – BBC Indie Chart), "Loneliness" and "Stand By". The band has had critical acclaim from such publications as NME, The Sunday Times and Daily Star. They have also had exposure on BBC Radio 2 from both Dermot O'Leary and Steve Lamacq.

Lead singer Ben Burrows is younger brother to Andy Burrows, former drummer of Razorlight. They supported Razorlight at a secret gig at The Railway Inn, Winchester when Razorlight previewed second album material.

Captain Phoenix has toured the UK extensively, and toured Japan for the first time in November 2007. They supported The Kooks for three dates at the end of January 2008, as part of the warm up tour for their upcoming album Konk.

== Discography ==
Singles

- "Living on the Guestlist"
- "Pistols & Hearts" (No. 29 UK Indie Chart)
- "Loneliness"
- "Stand By"

Albums

- Life.Temper.Riot

== Members ==
- Ben Burrows – Lead vocals, bass
- Luke Keyte – Lead guitar
- Nick Hill – Rhythm guitar, backing vocals
- Ross Curnow – Drums
- Simon Hill – Keyboard
