= Hot Girls Wanted =

2015 American documentary

- Film poster
- Directed by: Jill Bauer; Ronna Gradus
- Written by: Brittany Huckabee
- Produced by: Rashida Jones; Jill Bauer; Ronna Gradus; Brittany Huckabee
- Cinematography: Ronna Gradus
- Edited by: Brittany Huckabee
- Music by: Daniel Ahearn; Tyler Strickland
- Production company: Two to Tangle Productions
- Distributed by: Netflix
- Release dates: January 24, 2015 (Sundance); May 29, 2015 (Netflix)
- Running time: 84 minutes
- Country: United States
- Language: English

Hot Girls Wanted is a 2015 American documentary film directed by Jill Bauer and Ronna Gradus. The film follows the lives of several 18- and 19-year-old pornographic actresses. The film premiered at the 2015 Sundance Film Festival and was released on Netflix on May 29, 2015.

== Synopsis ==
Several 20- to 33-year-old young women are interviewed about their experiences as pornography performers. Several women, including Rachel Bernard, Tressa Silguero and Karly Stouffer are recruited by a 23-year-old pro-amateur porn agent Riley Reynolds to live in his North Miami Beach home.

== Production ==
The film was originally imagined as an exploration of male consumption of pornography on college campuses. The filmmakers abandoned this idea when they discovered that the men were mostly watching pornographic videos starring young women. Curious about why such a large number of young women were entering the industry, the film was reoriented to tell their story. Edits took place after the Sundance premiere to address issues the filmmakers identified during screenings. This included clarification that the film is neither pro-pornography nor anti-pornography, a change which followed tweets from people in the pornography industry who felt threatened or judged.

== Release ==
Hot Girls Wanted premiered at the 2015 Sundance Film Festival. Netflix picked the film up for distribution and released it on May 29, 2015.

== Reception ==
=== Reviewers ===
Review aggregator Rotten Tomatoes gives the film an 82% positive review, with nine of eleven surveyed critics giving it a positive review; the average rating is 6.5/10. Geoff Berkshire of Variety wrote, "An intimate and ultimately harrowing peek inside the world of amateur porn, Hot Girls Wanted will shock and outrage audiences in equal measure." Leslie Felperin of The Hollywood Reporter called it a "rigorous, timely study". Jordan Hoffman of The Guardian rated it 2/5 stars and wrote, "If you were in the dark about the potential dangers for young women of employment in the porn industry, this documentary may prove instructive. For everyone else, it's an unnecessary – if salutary – reminder." Mike Hale of The New York Times described it as "a documentary with a provocative subject and title but an uncertain tone that vacillates between weary outrage and motherly concern."

Reynolds and two of his performers said that the film focuses too much on the worst-case scenarios. Regardless, Reynolds said the film has inspired young women to enter pornography.

=== Rashida Jones' involvement ===
Producer Rashida Jones, before making this documentary, had controversies in the world of sex workers. InsideHook's Kayla Kibbe states, "Critics accused Jones of doxxing the film's subjects, exposing personal information and recycling content without their permission." Sex workers have criticized the documentary as invasion of privacy. The Daily Dot reported a quote from Mistress Matisse: "Hot Girls Wanted was not made by anyone who's actually in the sex industry, and it was very obviously planned to fulfill an agenda, and that agenda is to make the sex industry look bad." In The New York Times Ana Marie Cox interviews Jones and mentions her past comments on sex workers: "But in 2013, you wrote a pretty strident essay in Glamour against the 'pornification' of everything, where you recount using the hashtag #stopactinglikewhores."

== Turned On ==
Hot Girls Wanted: Turned On, a six-part Netflix documentary series exploring pornography, technology and relationships, was released in April 2017.
