= Holly Randall =

American photographer and director (born 1978)

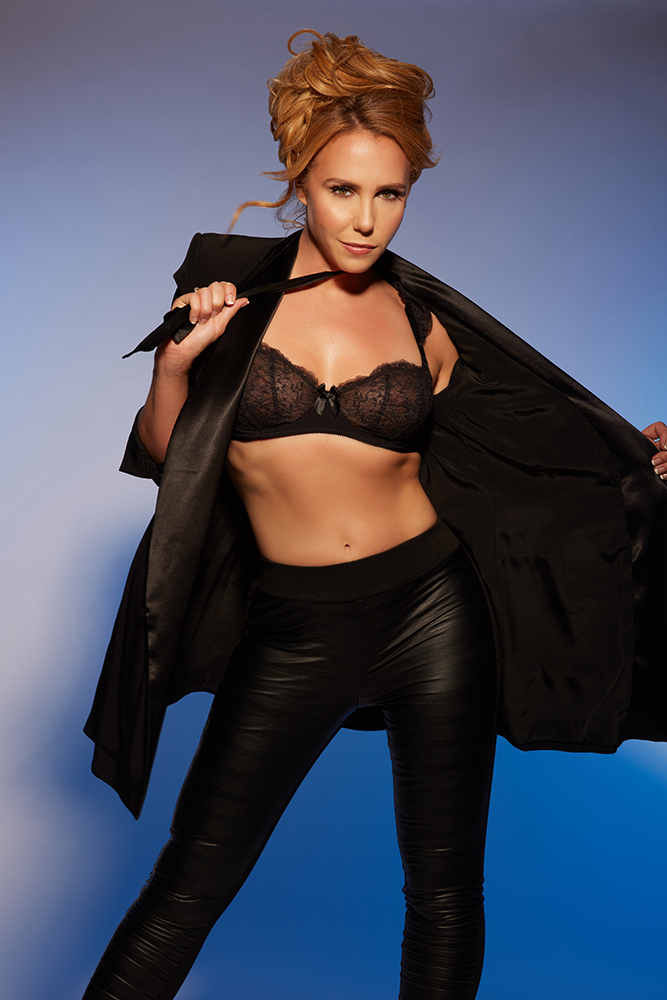
- Randall in 2016
- Born: September 5, 1978 (age 48); Los Angeles, California, U.S.
- Occupations: Photographer; film director; producer; publisher; entrepreneur; podcast host
- Years active: 2004–present
- Parents: Humphry Knipe (father); Suze Randall (mother)

Holly Randall (born September 5, 1978) is an American photographer, film director, producer, publisher, entrepreneur, and podcast host. She is known for her work in adult entertainment photography and filmmaking, as well as for hosting the long-running podcast Holly Randall Unfiltered. Randall is regarded as one of the most influential female creative executives in the adult entertainment industry and was named among the industry’s most influential women by AVN in 2013. In 2024, she was inducted into the AVN Hall of Fame.

== Early life and education ==
Randall was born in Los Angeles, California, to erotic photographer Suze Randall and author Humphry Knipe. She was raised in a household shaped by both British cultural traditions and progressive attitudes toward sexuality and creative expression.

Her name was derived from Hollywood Presbyterian Medical Center, where she was born. Randall was exposed to photography and visual storytelling from an early age.

She studied photography at the later closed Brooks Institute in Santa Barbara before transferring to University of California, Los Angeles, where she graduated in 2003 with a degree in world literature.

While still a university student, Randall entered the adult entertainment industry at age twenty by assisting with operations for the family-run website Suze.net.

== Personal life ==
Randall has two children, one daughter and a son born in October 2026.

== Career ==
=== Photography and early film work ===
Randall began shooting professionally for Suze.net while studying at UCLA and quickly established herself as an erotic photographer.

In 2004, she expanded into directing and producing video content for Suze.net, developing expertise in cinematography, production management, and digital distribution.

Her client portfolio eventually included Playboy, Penthouse, Twistys, Digital Playground, Wicked Pictures, Brazzers, and Hustler.

=== Holly Randall Productions ===
In 2008, Randall launched Holly Randall Productions and her membership-based platform.

She produced the films Hopeless and Broken Butterfly, both directed by filmmaker Jeffrey John Hart. The two projects were developed in under Holly Randall Productions. Broken Butterfly: The Perfect Shade of Blu received critical recognition, winning AVN Awards for Best Featurette and Best Screenplay – Featurette, along with an XBIZ XMA Award for Best Featurette.

Hopeless received industry recognition, winning Featurette of the Year at the XBIZ Awards the year prior to the release of Broken Butterfly.

=== Television and Media Appearances ===
Randall and her mother Suze Randall were profiled in Secret Lives of Women: Sex for Sale on the WE channel. Both have been featured on The Insider and Playboy TV's Sexcetera.

Premiering in November 2013, she has her own show on Playboy TV called Adult Film School where she hosts and directs amateurs in their own professional sex tape.

Randall appears in the online reality TV series The Sex Factor, in which she performs photoshoots for the female contestants, and eventually for the winner of episode 2.

She also served as a guest judge on Season 2 of DP Star and later produced DP Star 3.

In addition to her work within adult entertainment, Randall has made numerous appearances across mainstream television and documentary media as a public commentator on the adult industry. Her media appearances have included interviews and featured segments on The Rachel Maddow Show, The Daily Show, CNN, CBS, the WE television documentary series Secret Lives of Women, the Netflix documentary series Hot Girls Wanted: Turned On, Amazon Prime Video’s documentary Back Issues: The Hustler Magazine Story, and Vice TV’s documentary program Before the Internet.

=== Holly Randall Unfiltered ===
In 2017, Randall launched Holly Randall Unfiltered, a weekly interview podcast focused on candid discussions with performers, directors, educators, and sex-positive public figures.

In 2025, the podcast was included in Sean Malin’s The Podcast Pantheon: 101 Podcasts That Changed How We Listen, placing it alongside historically influential mainstream podcasts.

=== Holly Randall Agency ===
In January 2026, Randall co-founded Holly Randall Agency with Jeffrey Hart and Andrew Nagle.

Wet Ink Magazine

In 2026, Randall launched Wet Ink Magazine, an editorial publication focused on long-form journalism, creator voices, criticism, and cultural commentary surrounding adult media and sex work.

== Publications ==
- Erotic Dream Girls. Goliath, 2009. ISBN 9783936709391.
- Kinky Nylons. Goliath, 2011. ISBN 9783936709506.
- Kinky Super Beauties
- Kinky Lingerie
- Dynasty, Holy Crow Press

== Awards ==
- 2024: Inducted into the AVN Hall of Fame
- 2013 — Named among AVN’s Most Influential Women
- 2019 — XCritic Lifetime Achievement Award
- Xbiz photography site of the year
- 2025 AVN Awards, winning Best Featurette and Best Screenplay – Featurette for Broken.
- 2025 XBIZ Awards, winning Featurette of the Year at the XBIZ Awards for Hopeless.
