= Hot Girls Wanted: Turned On =

Television series

- Official poster
- Genre: Documentary series
- Country of origin: United States
- Original language: English
- No. of episodes: 6

Production
- Producers: Jill Bauer; Ronna Gradus; Rashida Jones
- Running time: 41–58 minutes

Original release
- Network: Netflix
- Release: April 21, 2017

Hot Girls Wanted: Turned On is a six-part Netflix series that premiered on April 21, 2017. A follow-up to the 2015 documentary film Hot Girls Wanted, it was produced by Jill Bauer, Ronna Gradus, and Rashida Jones. The series explores pornography, technology, and relationships.

It aimed to include more diverse narratives than Hot Girls Wanted, which was criticized by sex workers for not containing positive stories about the sex industry. However, many sex workers featured in Turned On stated that their consent was violated and they and their families were put at risk, including two women whose content was displayed in the series without their knowledge. The pornographic actor Gia Paige, featured in the episode "Money Shot", said that the production violated her boundaries, that they included her in the series despite agreeing to edit her out, and that they included part of her real name. Other than criticism on ethical grounds, the series received largely positive critical reception.

== Background ==
The series is a continuation of the 2015 documentary film Hot Girls Wanted, and has the same producers: Jill Bauer, Ronna Gradus, and Rashida Jones. Jones said that she became interested in the sex industry after watching pornography and searching for content that matched her desires, rather than more extreme content presented to her on tube sites. Hot Girls Wanted drew criticism within the sex industry for its omission of any positive side of the industry. Turned On was released on April 21, 2017.

== Synopsis ==
The first episode, "Women on Top", is about women's pornography and feminism in porn: it features Holly Randall and Erika Lust. The second episode, "Love Me Tinder", is about a former reality television figure's experience of dating apps. "Owning It" depicts a woman working in recruitment for pornography, and one female performer that she brings into the industry. "Money Shot" is about the pornographic agent Riley Reynolds and his then-girlfriend Gia Paige, a pornographic actor. "Take Me Private" stars a cam girl, who the documentarians introduce to one of her viewers. "Don't Stop Filming" details an incident where an 18-year-old girl filmed her friend being raped on the livestreaming website Periscope, and was charged with rape and kidnapping offences.

== Production ==
In response to criticism of Hot Girls Wanted, Jones said that Turned On set out to "show that there are many stories in the porn industry", such as the more positive "Women on Top" episode that she directed. She commented that a theme of the series is "self-empowerment versus self-objectification".

== Reception ==
=== By sex workers ===
First reported by Vocativ, at least four of the sex workers featured in Turned On were unhappy with the production, saying that it violated their consent. Gia Paige initially agreed to appear in "Money Shot" but was uncomfortable with the directors pressuring her to talk about her family, and the camera crew filming her after she asked them to stop. The filming process gave her a panic attack. According to Paige and Reynolds, producers agreed that Paige would not appear in the final edit in exchange for additional filming with Reynolds. However, she was included in the series, and her Facebook profile and part of her legal name was displayed unobscured. Paige only discovered her inclusion when messaged by a fan who had used the information to work out her full legal name and other personal information. Bauer and Gradus said that Paige's claims were false.

Turned On also featured a public Periscope clip of two women who wrote that the production did not inform them of their appearance. It is used in "Don't Stop Filming" to explain the nature of the website. While one of them reached out to the production, who said they could "explain fair use" to her, the other told Vocativ that the display of the clip to a wide audience put her family's safety at risk. Bauer and Gradus said that the Periscope depiction was legal, and that the women featured are "never ever" labelled as sex workers. Gradus stated that "the viewers never would have known" the women's identities had they not "identified themselves". Asked by Variety interviewer Daniel Holloway whether the women's aims were to "grow their profiles", Gradus said "that's a fair question".

A pornographic agent featured in the series said that he asked whether the production was part of Hot Girls Wanted and was told it was not; he stated that he would not have participated if he had known, and did not discover the association until the program's debut. Another criticism came from Reynolds, whose father's face is partially shown in the series despite agreements that he would not appear. The pornographic trade association Free Speech Coalition said that if the sex workers' allegations were true then "the producers may be perpetuating unfair labor practices against adult performers". They urged that Netflix "immediately pause the distribution" of the program. A pornographic agent told The Daily Beast that the documentary's subjects were not treated ethically, while a pornographic actor told the same publication that she disliked how unprofessional and abnormal actors were centered in the stories.

Jones has not apologized for the decisions made in Turned On. In 2021, an announced documentary adaptation of Sell/Buy/Date, a one-person play about the sex industry, drew backlash for Jones's involvement.

=== By critics ===
Overall, the series received positive critical reception. Some critics compared it favorably to the technology-focused science fiction anthology series Black Mirror. Shirley Li of Entertainment Weekly gave the documentary series an A−, praising the first, third and fifth episodes. She praised that the production had learned from Hot Girls Wanted criticisms and that the longer format lets the producers "simply sit back and tell six stories". Li criticized the second episode as "staged" and less interesting, and the fourth as "largely a sequel to the original doc that tries to cover too much".

Ed Power of The Daily Telegraph rated it four out of five, describing "the sordid truth of the business" as "impossible to ignore" despite the narrative's "pains not to lecture the viewer regarding the morality of pornography". Julia Raeside of The Guardian reviewed that it "largely succeeds" in its mission to "stand back and remain nonjudgmental about its subjects". Particularly praising the final episode, Raeside wrote that "director Peter Logreco draws the story out of Marina and her devastated father with skill and lack of sensationalism, creating a truly important work".

Robert Lloyd of the Los Angeles Times believed that "most every episode packs the weight and complexity of a good feature film", displaying sufficient variety and "the photographic sophistication of other Netflix documentary series", an improvement over Hot Girls Wanted. Lloyd said that the narrative is feminist and that it "deals with issues like class and race in ways you will not have seen before". Kate Lloyd of Time Out praised the first two episodes, saying that the series will "probably challenge your behaviour and complicity" in relation to "sex, intimacy and relationships".

Jo Livingstone of The New Republic criticized the ethical standards of the production, saying that they "enact precisely the kind of objectification and dehumanization that they aim to critique" and that the documentary's "lack of interest" in consent "should alarm viewers interested in journalistic ethics, women's safety, or both".
