= Paul M. Smith =

American lawyer

Paul Smith
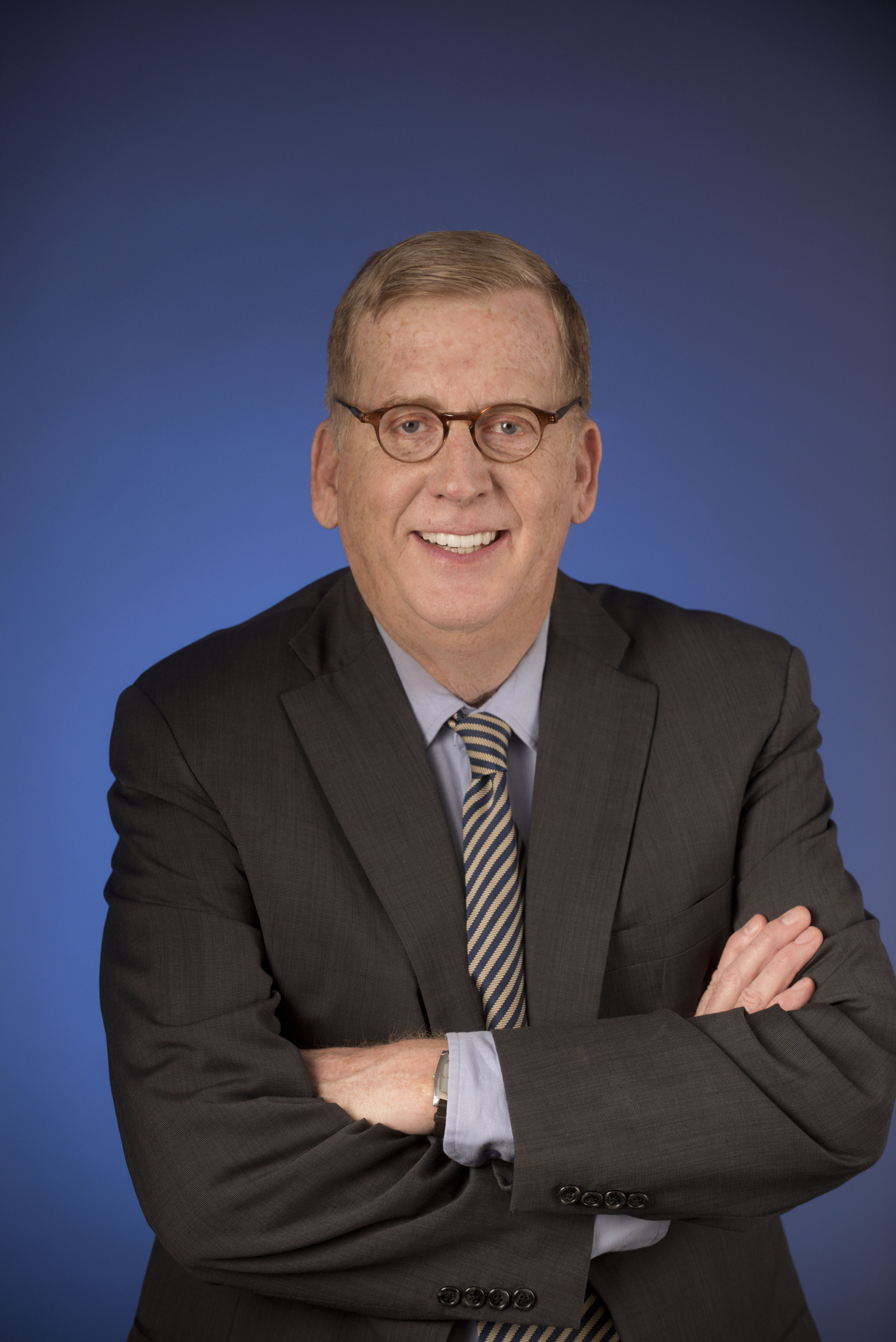

Personal details
- Born: 1955 (age 70–71) Salt Lake City, Utah, U.S.
- Education: Amherst College; Yale University

Paul March Smith (born 1955) is an American attorney. He has argued 21 cases before the Supreme Court of the United States, including Lawrence v. Texas. In January 2017, he joined the faculty at Georgetown University Law Center, and also the Campaign Legal Center in Washington, D.C., as vice president of litigation and strategy. Until 2017, he was a partner at Jenner & Block's Washington, D.C., office where he served as co-chair of the firm's election law and redistricting practice.

== Education ==
Smith graduated summa cum laude and Phi Beta Kappa from Amherst College in 1976 and received his J.D. degree from Yale Law School in 1979, where he served as editor-in-chief of the Yale Law Journal. In 2016, Smith was elected to the Amherst College Board of Trustees.

== Professional career ==
After law school, Smith was a law clerk to Judge James L. Oakes of the United States Court of Appeals for the Second Circuit. From 1980–81, Smith was a law clerk to Supreme Court Justice Lewis F. Powell. Smith practiced law for 13 years in Washington, D.C., with the firms of Onek, Klein & Farr and Klein, Farr, Smith & Taranto.

He had an active Supreme Court practice, including oral arguments in nineteen Supreme Court cases. These arguments have included two congressional redistricting cases, Lawrence v. Texas, involving the constitutionality of the Texas sodomy statute, United States v. American Library Association, involving a First Amendment challenge to the Children's Internet Protection Act and Mathias v. WorldCom (2001), dealing with the Eleventh Amendment immunity of state commissions. Smith also worked extensively on several other First Amendment cases in the Supreme Court, involving issues ranging from commercial speech to defamation to "adult" speech on the Internet.

In February 2017, it was announced that Smith would be representing a group of 12 voters in the State of Wisconsin who were challenging the voting maps for its state assembly districts as unconstitutional partisan gerrymandering. Smith argued Gill v. Whitford before the Supreme Court on October 3, 2017. It was the first partisan gerrymandering case to be heard by the Supreme Court since 2004. In that case, Smith argued that partisan gerrymandering is a harm to democracy and that we are on the "cusp of a more serious problem" because officials drawing redistricting maps now have access to vast amounts of data, and because the electorate is now so polarized that voting has become more predictable than ever.

Smith is also a former chair of Lambda Legal's national board of directors.

== Personal life ==
Smith is married to Michael Dennis and has two children.

== Accomplishments ==
- Best Lawyers named him the Washington, D.C., First Amendment Lawyer of the Year for 2012.
- The American Bar Association presented Smith with the Thurgood Marshall Award in 2010.
- Named one of "The Most Influential Lawyers of the Decade" for civil rights by The National Law Journal in 2010.

== Bar membership ==
Smith was admitted to the bar in DC (on December 18, 1981), Maryland (on June 3, 1988), and New York (in 2006).

== See also ==
- List of law clerks for the first seat of the Supreme Court of the United States
