= Boston Duck Tours =

American tourism company

- Industry: Tourism
- Founded: October 5, 1994 in Boston, Massachusetts, United States
- Founder: Andrew Wilson
- Website: bostonducktours.com

Boston Duck Tours is a privately owned company that operates historical tours of the city of Boston using replica World War II amphibious DUKW vehicles. Boston Duck Tours first started running tours in Boston, Massachusetts on October 5, 1994. The company has three departure locations throughout the city of Boston: the Prudential Center, the Museum of Science and the New England Aquarium.

== Company history ==
Founder Andrew Wilson was inspired by the famous duck tours of Wisconsin Dells, Wisconsin. The company started running tours in Boston with four Ducks and now runs a fleet of 28. The first departure location was on Long Wharf in front of the New England Aquarium. In 1997 the Boston Duck Tours operation was moved to the Back Bay neighborhood of Boston at the Prudential Center. In 2002, Boston Duck Tours opened a second departure and ticketing location at the Museum of Science. In 2009, Boston Duck Tours opened a third departure and ticketing location at the New England Aquarium. Boston Duck Tours carries approximately 600,000 passengers per year.

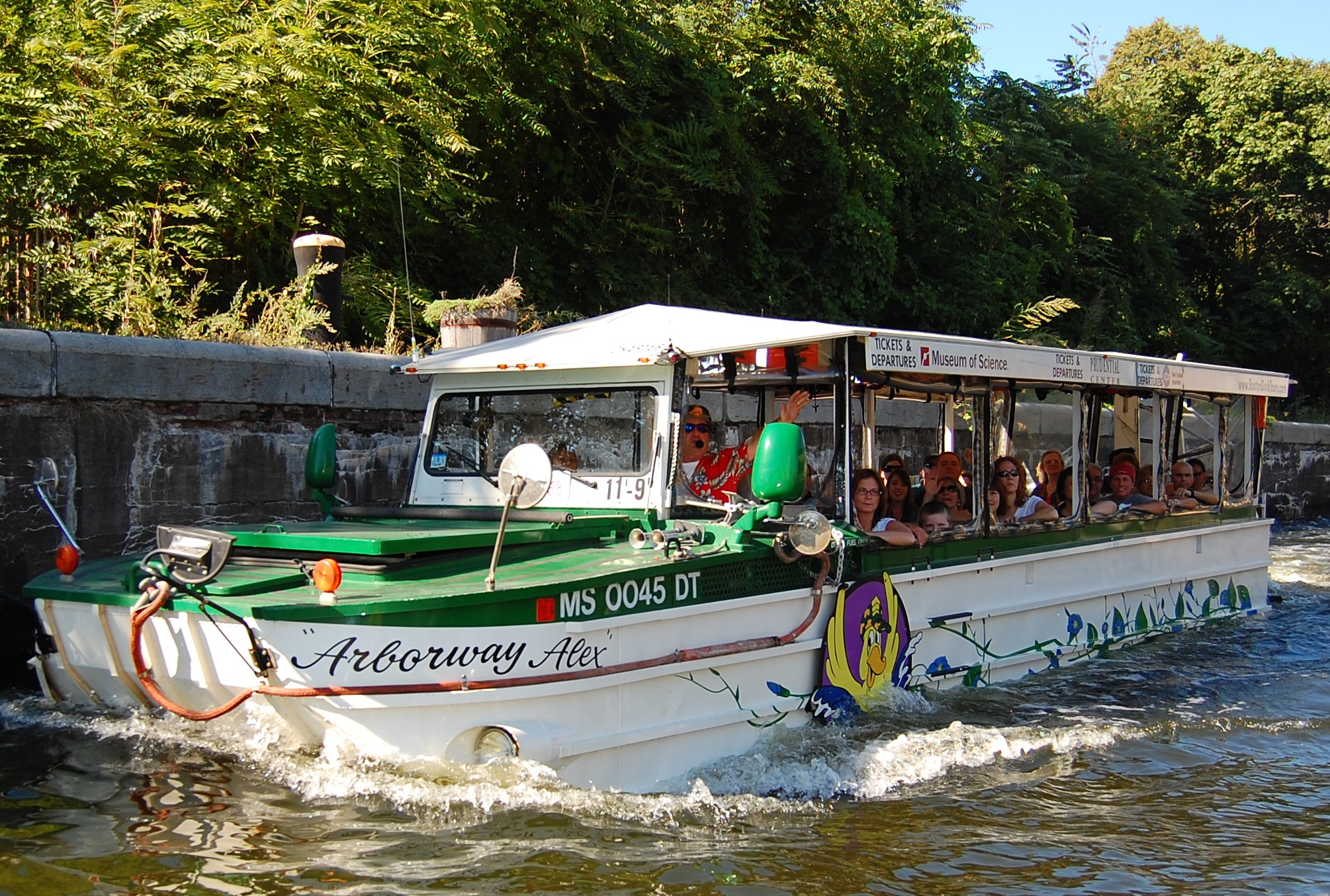
A Boston Duck Tour DUKW in the Charles River

In 2002, the Boston Duck Tour Ducks were first used as the parade vehicles for the New England Patriots after the Patriots won Super Bowl XXXVI over the St. Louis Rams. Since that time, the Boston Duck Tour Ducks have participated in 13 professional sports championship parades in Boston. There have been six for New England Patriots (2002, 2004, 2005, 2015, 2017, 2019), four for the Boston Red Sox (2004, 2007, 2013, 2018), two for the Boston Celtics (2008, 2024), and one for the Boston Bruins (2011). With these parades having become a frequent occurrence since 2002, "Cue the Duck Boats" has become a popular catchphrase in Boston among the city's sports fans. The Duck Boats were first planned to be used for the New England Patriots in 1997 however they did not win Super Bowl XXXI. While much of the parade routes over the years consisted of the DUKWs staying on land, some featured the DUKWs traversing both the land and across the Charles River.

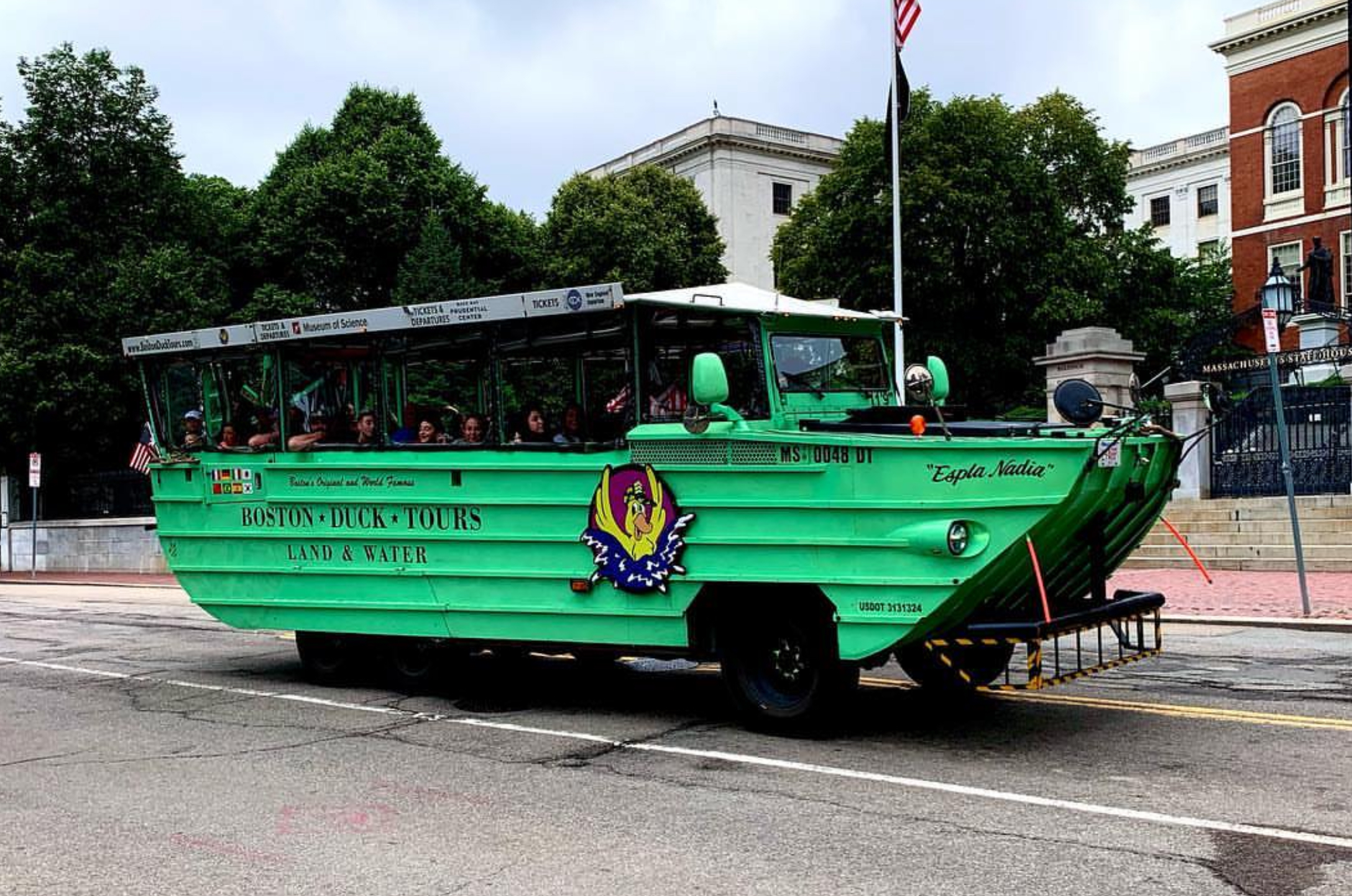
Boston Duck Tours GMC-DUKW operating a route on a city street

In 2010, Boston Duck Tours was asked to help transport flood victims in Wayland, MA. Torrential rains had left the Pelham Island area of Wayland isolated and the Ducks were brought in to ferry people in and out of their neighborhood until the waters receded. On August 7, 2014, Boston Duck Tours retired its last remaining original World War II DUKW from regularly scheduled tours. As of 2015 all regular tours are conducted on replica DUKWs that are larger and easier to repair than the original vehicles, and run on bio diesel.

== Safety and Accidents ==
On April 30, 2016, a Boston Duck Tours vehicle struck a motor scooter at the intersection of Charles and Beacon Streets, resulting in the death of 28-year-old Allison Warmuth. This followed a series of smaller accidents, including a 2010 collision that injured five people.

In response to the 2016 tragedy, the Massachusetts Department of Public Utilities and state legislators implemented new safety requirements for amphibious tour vehicles. These regulations included:

- Safety Technology: Mandatory installation of blind-spot cameras and proximity sensors on all DUKW and replica vehicles.
- Crewing Requirements: A prohibition on "single-operator" tours. Drivers are now required to focus solely on navigation, while a separate narrator must be present to handle the tour's historical commentary.
- Operating Restrictions: Limitations on tour routes to avoid high-risk intersections where visibility is most compromised for the large vehicles.
