= D. J. MacLeay =

American basketball player and coach

Boston Celtics
- Title: Assistant coach
- League: NBA

Personal information
- Born: October 6, 1994 (age 32) San Antonio, Texas, U.S.
- Listed height: 6 ft 7 in (2.01 m)
- Listed weight: 225 lb (102 kg)

Career information
- High school: Ronald Reagan (San Antonio, Texas)
- College: Bucknell (2013–2017)
- NBA draft: 2017: undrafted
- Position: Power forward / center
- Coaching career: 2022–present

Career history

Coaching
- 2022–present: Boston Celtics (assistant)

Career highlights
- As assistant coach: NBA champion (2024)

David Jess MacLeay (born October 6, 1994) is an American professional basketball coach and former player who is an assistant coach for the Boston Celtics of the National Basketball Association (NBA).

== High school career ==
MacLeay grew up in San Antonio and attended Ronald Reagan High School. At Reagan, MacLeay lettered three times each in basketball and track and field. On the basketball team, MacLeay was team captain and earned all-state and all-region honors while on the team. As a senior, MacLeay averaged 16 points and 11 rebounds per game for Reagan High School.

MacLeay was in the 2013 basketball recruiting class and was ranked as a 2-star recruit by 247Sports and ESPN. According to both 247Sports and ESPN, MacLeay was only offered by Bucknell and he committed to play for Bucknell in September 2012.

== College career ==
MacLeay played for Bucknell for four seasons from 2013 to 2017.

In his freshman year, MacLeay appeared in 16 games off the bench for the Bison, averaging 1.5 points per game.

In his sophomore year at Bucknell, MacLeay averaged 3.6 points and appeared in 30 games for Bucknell. He set a career-high in scoring with 12 points in a win against Case Western Reserve. In a loss against Villanova, MacLeay recorded a career-high in rebounds with 11. His 11 rebounds against Villanova was the 4th-highest in Bucknell school history against a ranked opponent at the time. During his sophomore year, the Bison were Patriot League regular season champions.

In MacLeay's junior year at Bucknell he appeared in 31 games and averaged a career-high 5.2 points per game. He recorded a new career-high in scoring with 15 points in a win over Lafayette. MacLeay's junior year was the best of his collegiate career, excelling in a back-up role for Bucknell shooting 63.3% from the field and averaging 3.6 rebounds per game, both also career-highs. As a junior, MacLeay's Bison were once again Patriot League regular season champions but did not qualify for the NCAA tournament.

In his senior season at Bucknell, MacLeay played in a career-high 33 games. Team success-wise it was the most successful season of MacLeay's collegiate career, with the Bison winning the 2017 Patriot League tournament and earning a spot in the 2017 NCAA tournament. In the 2017 NCAA tournament, Bucknell was the #13 seed and lost to West Virginia in the first round, which would be MacLeay's final collegiate game. During the season he also made his lone career start in the last game of the regular season against Navy.

== Coaching career ==
MacLeay began his coaching career with the Philadelphia 76ers, being employed with the 76ers for four and a half years and serving as Philadelphia's video coordinator for three years.

In July 2021, it was reported that the Celtics were hiring MacLeay as a player enhancement coach under head coach Ime Udoka. He was promoted to assistant coach for the Celtics in July 2022.

After Udoka left the Celtics, MacLeay was retained as a member of new head coach Joe Mazzulla’s coaching staff.

With the Celtics, MacLeay has worked with big men, such as center Kristaps Porzingis, throughout his time as a player enhancement coach and assistant coach with Boston. MacLeay worked on the Celtics coaching staff alongside fellow assistant Charles Lee, who coached him at Bucknell and is a Bucknell alum himself. MacLeay became an NBA champion when the Celtics defeated the Dallas Mavericks in 5 games in the 2024 NBA Finals.

In July 2024, MacLeay was the head coach for the Celtics summer league team at the 2024 NBA Summer League in Las Vegas.

== Personal life ==
Born October 6, 1994, in San Antonio, MacLeay is the son of Glenn and Kelle MacLeay. He has a younger sister Bethany. Attended Bucknell University where he graduated with a degree majoring in markets, innovation, and design.
