= Matt Reynolds (basketball) =

American basketball coach

Boston Celtics
- Position: Assistant coach
- League: NBA

Personal information
- Born: Lexington, Massachusetts, U.S.

Career information
- High school: Lexington
- College: Syracuse
- Coaching career: 2022–present

Career history

Coaching
- 2022–present: Boston Celtics (assistant)

Career highlights
- NBA champion (2024)

Matthew Reynolds is an American professional basketball coach who is an assistant coach for the Boston Celtics of the National Basketball Association (NBA).

== Coaching career ==
Reynolds began his career in coaching first while attending Syracuse University, serving as a team manager for the Syracuse Orange under head coach Jim Boeheim.

Reynolds has experience in the high school and collegiate basketball ranks. He previously served as an assistant coach for the boys' basketball team at Woburn Memorial High School in Woburn, Massachusetts.

Reynolds was also an intern for UNC Asheville, serving as director of basketball operations. In the 2012 NCAA tournament, Reynold's #16 seed UNC Asheville Bulldogs faced off against his alma mater in #1 seed Syracuse.

He was also a graduate assistant at Eastern Michigan.

Reynolds began his career in the NBA in 2015 with the Boston Celtics, first serving as an assistant video coordinator under head coach Brad Stevens.

In 2016, Reynolds was named as a video coordinator for the Celtics under Stevens.

From 2019 to 2022, Reynolds served as a special assistant to the coach under Stevens and later under head coach Ime Udoka.

In 2022, Reynolds was named as an assistant coach under Udoka and was retained on the coaching staff of new Celtics head coach Joe Mazzulla. Under Mazzulla, Reynolds has been in charge of deciding whether the Celtics should use a coach's challenge to trigger an instant video review of a call during a game. Reynolds became an NBA champion when the Celtics defeated the Dallas Mavericks in 5 games in the 2024 NBA Finals.

== Personal life ==
Reynolds’ parents are David and Mary Reynolds. He has a sister named Katie. Reynolds graduated from Syracuse University where he majored in sports management. Reynolds is a native of Lexington, Massachusetts.
