= Luke Kornet =

American basketball player (born 1995)

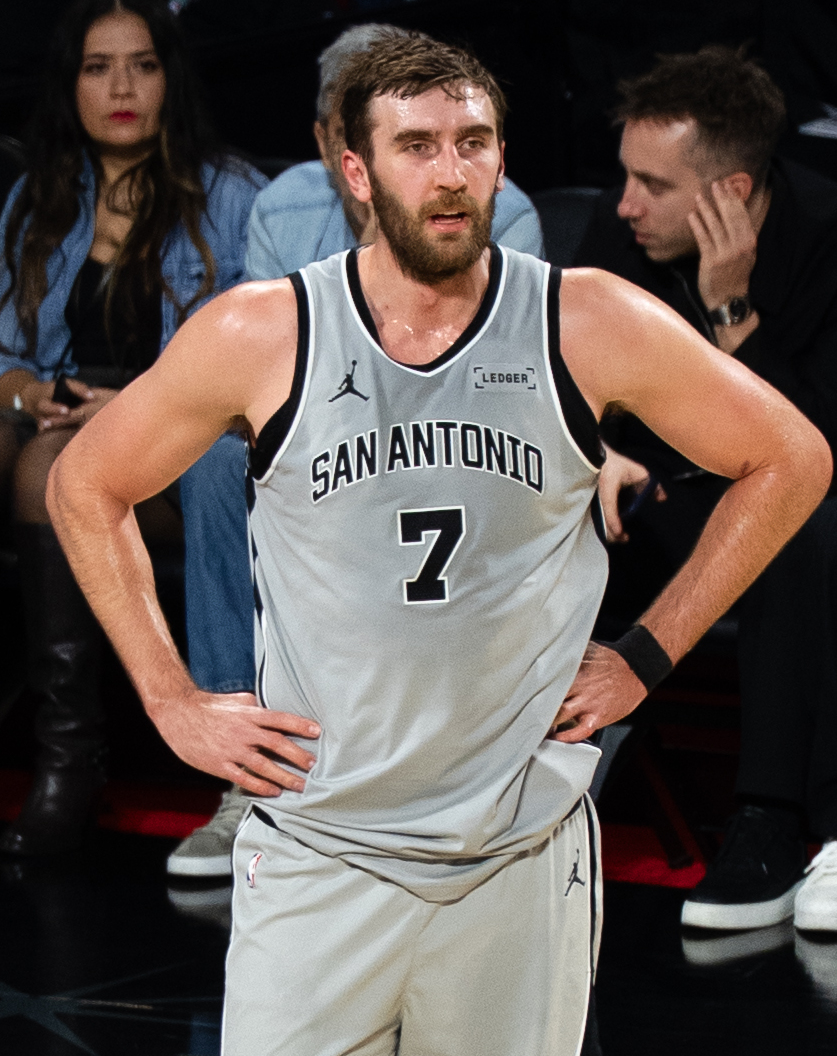
- Kornet with the San Antonio Spurs in 2025

No. 7 – San Antonio Spurs
- Position: Center / power forward
- League: NBA

Personal information
- Born: July 15, 1995 (age 31) Lexington, Kentucky, U.S.
- Listed height: 7 ft 1 in (2.16 m)
- Listed weight: 250 lb (113 kg)

Career information
- High school: Liberty Christian School (Argyle, Texas)
- College: Vanderbilt (2013–2017)
- NBA draft: 2017: undrafted
- Playing career: 2017–present

Career history
- 2017–2019: New York Knicks
- 2017–2018: →Westchester Knicks
- 2019–2021: Chicago Bulls
- 2021: Boston Celtics
- 2021: Maine Celtics
- 2021–2022: Cleveland Cavaliers
- 2022: Milwaukee Bucks
- 2022: Maine Celtics
- 2022–2025: Boston Celtics
- 2025–present: San Antonio Spurs

Career highlights
- NBA champion (2024); Third-team All-NBA G League (2018); First-team All-SEC (2017); 2× SEC All-Defensive Team (2016, 2017)
- Stats at NBA.com
- Stats at Basketball Reference

Luke Francis Kornet (/kɔːrˈnɛt/ kor-NET; born July 15, 1995) is an American professional basketball player for the San Antonio Spurs of the National Basketball Association (NBA). He played college basketball for Vanderbilt and is the all-time leader for blocked shots in the school's history and the NCAA all-time leader for three-pointers made by any player seven feet tall or taller. Kornet became an NBA champion upon winning the 2024 NBA Finals with the Boston Celtics. His stature and playing style have earned him the nicknames "The Green Kornet" and "The Big Elote" by Celtics and Spurs fans, respectively.

== College career ==
Kornet averaged 8.9 points, 4.8 rebounds and 1.64 blocks over 24.1 minutes in 128 games during his four-year career at Vanderbilt University. During his senior year with the Commodores, Kornet averaged 13.2 points, 6.2 rebounds and 2.00 blocks in 35 starts, earning All-SEC and All-SEC Defensive honors. He holds the NCAA record for three-pointers made by a 7-footer with 150 and is the Commodores' all-time leading shot blocker with 210. On January 12, 2016, Kornet blocked a school-record 10 shots and finished with the second triple-double in Vanderbilt history with 11 points and 11 rebounds, helping the Commodores defeat Auburn 75–57.

== Professional career ==
=== New York Knicks (2017–2019) ===
After going undrafted in the 2017 NBA draft, Kornet joined the New York Knicks for the 2017 NBA Summer League. On July 3, 2017, he signed a two-way contract with the Knicks. On February 8, 2018, with his parents in attendance, Kornet made his NBA debut against the Toronto Raptors in Toronto. Kornet finished with a double-double, scoring 11 points and 10 rebounds in 22 minutes, thus being the second Knicks rookie in history to debut with a double-double. He also finished with four blocks, making him the first player in NBA history to sink three three-pointers and have four blocks in his debut.

On July 6, 2018, Kornet signed a standard contract with the Knicks. On April 9, 2019, he recorded a double-double with 12 points, 13 rebounds, and a career-high six blocks in a 96–86 victory over the Chicago Bulls.

=== Chicago Bulls (2019–2021) ===
On July 17, 2019, Kornet signed a fully guaranteed two-year contract for $4.5 million with the Chicago Bulls.

=== Boston Celtics (2021) ===
On March 25, 2021, Kornet was traded to the Boston Celtics in a three-team trade involving the Washington Wizards. He re-signed with the Celtics on October 16, but was waived later that day.

=== Maine Celtics (2021) ===
On October 23, Kornet signed with the Maine Celtics as an affiliate player. In 10 games, he averaged 11.9 points, 7.5 rebounds, 3.9 assists and 2.7 blocks in 27.4 minutes per contest.

=== Cleveland Cavaliers (2021–2022) ===
On December 21, 2021, Kornet signed a 10-day contract with the Cleveland Cavaliers.

=== Milwaukee Bucks (2022) ===
On January 3, 2022, Kornet signed a 10-day contract with the Milwaukee Bucks.

=== Return to Maine (2022) ===
On January 14, 2022, Kornet was reacquired by the Maine Celtics.

=== Return to Boston (2022–2025) ===
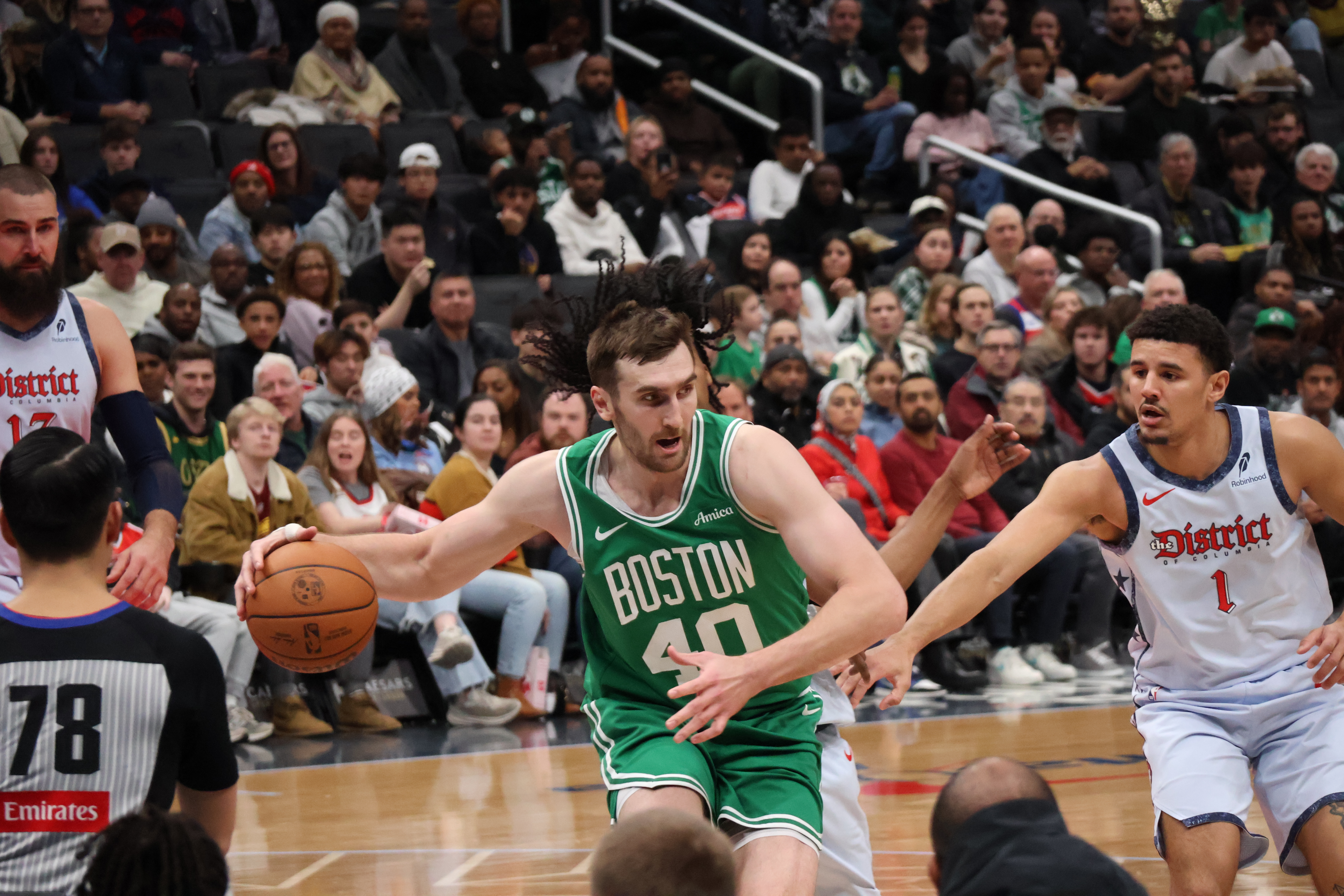
Kornet with the Boston Celtics in December 2024

On February 11, 2022, Kornet signed a contract with the Boston Celtics for the rest of the season. The Celtics made it to the NBA Finals, where they lost to the Golden State Warriors in six games despite a 2–1 lead.

On July 1, 2022, Kornet re-signed with the Celtics on a two-year, $4,546,582 contract, including $2,133,278 guaranteed, and an annual average salary of $2,273,291.

In 2023–24, Kornet earned a base salary of $2,413,304. He became an NBA champion when the Celtics defeated the Dallas Mavericks in five games in the 2024 NBA Finals.

On July 2, 2024, Kornet re-signed with the Celtics. He made 73 appearances (16 starts) for Boston during the 2024–25 NBA season, averaging 6.0 points, 5.3 rebounds, and 1.6 assists. In Game 5 of the Eastern Conference Semifinals against the New York Knicks on May 5, 2025, with Kristaps Porziņģis slowed due to virus symptoms, Kornet contributed 10 points, nine rebounds, and seven blocks in 26 minutes to help the Celtics win 108–105, staving off elimination.

=== San Antonio Spurs (2025–present) ===
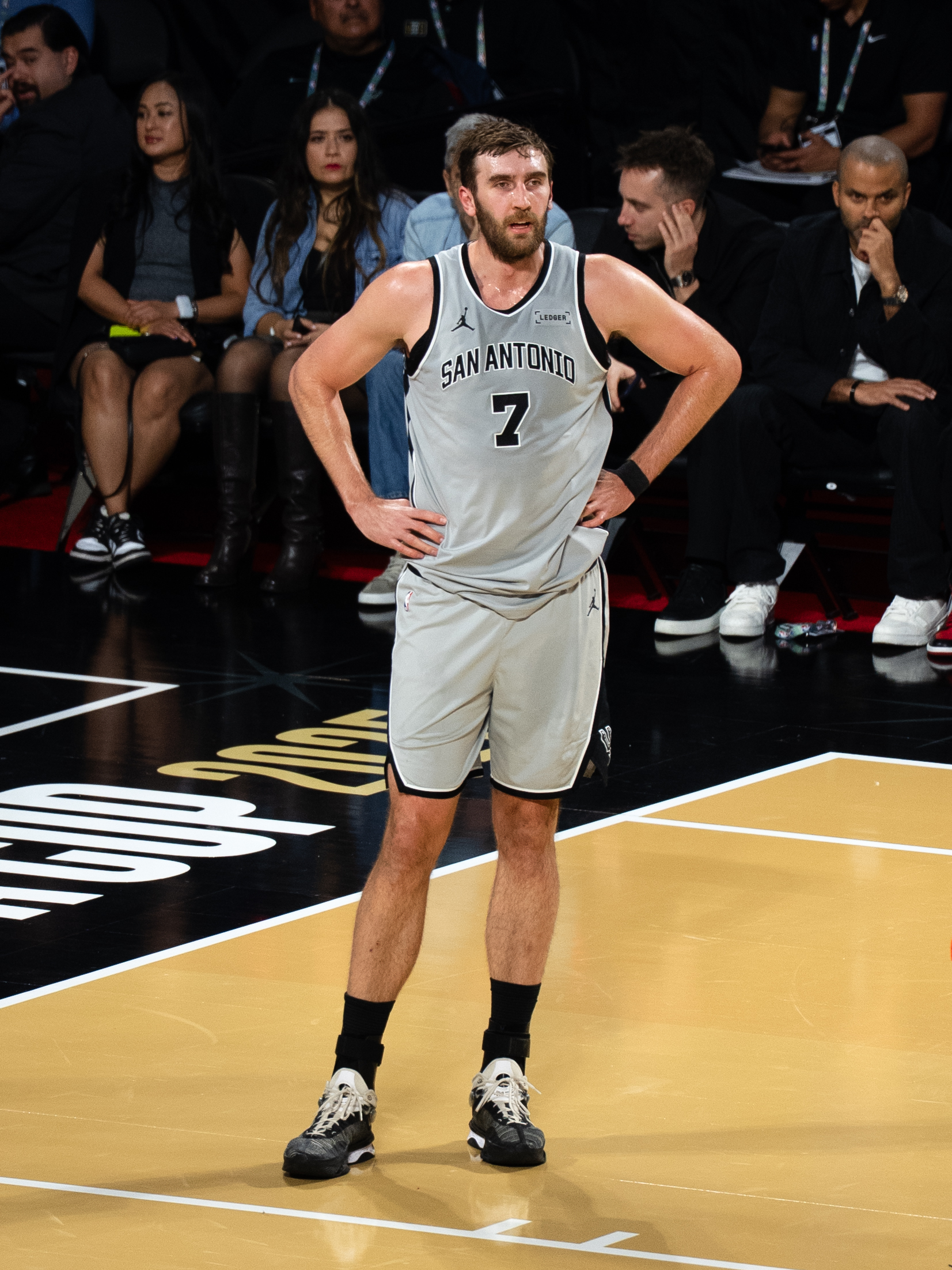
Kornet with the Spurs during the 2025 NBA Cup championship round

On June 30, 2025, Kornet agreed to a four-year, $41 million contract with the San Antonio Spurs. He formally signed with the Spurs on July 7. Kornet made his second NBA Finals appearance in the 2026 NBA playoffs, with the Spurs winning game 7 of the Western Conference Finals against the defending champion Oklahoma City Thunder, which included a notable chase down block on Isaiah Hartenstein by Kornet with under seven minutes remaining.

== Player profile ==
Kornet is known for developing an unorthodox method of shot contesting that he calls "The Eclipse". In this technique, also known as the "Kornet Contest", Kornet jumps with both hands raised and centered over his head, no matter the distance from the shooter. The goal is to visually block the basket and distract the shooter while avoiding the possibility of a foul for contact. As of December 6, 2022, opposing shooters were 5 for 18 on shot attempts against Kornet's Eclipse. While a small sample size, this conversion rate of 28% was well below the league average of 38% made on 3-point field goal attempts. "The Eclipse" has been attempted by other players including Marcus Smart, Jalen Duren, and Spurs teammate Victor Wembanyama. In Game 7 of the 2026 Western Conference Finals, Kornet made a pivotal chasedown block on an Isaiah Hartenstein breakaway dunk attempt midway through the fourth quarter to help seal the Spurs' victory and reach the NBA Finals for the first time since 2014.

== Career statistics ==
Legend
GP	Games played	GS	Games started	MPG	Minutes per game
FG%	Field goal percentage	3P%	3-point field goal percentage	FT%	Free throw percentage
RPG	Rebounds per game	APG	Assists per game	SPG	Steals per game
BPG	Blocks per game	PPG	Points per game	**Bold**	Career high
†	Won an NBA championship	*	Led the league

=== NBA ===
==== Regular season ====
Year	Team	GP	GS	MPG	FG%	3P%	FT%	RPG	APG	SPG	BPG	PPG
2017–18	New York	20	1	16.3	.392	.354	.727	3.2	1.3	.3	.8	6.7
2018–19	New York	46	18	17.0	.378	.363	.826	2.9	1.2	**.6**	.9	**7.0**
2019–20	Chicago	36	14	15.5	.438	.287	.714	2.3	.9	.3	.7	6.0
2020–21	Chicago	13	0	7.2	.333	.261	.500	1.2	.3	.2	.5	2.0
2020–21	Boston	18	2	14.1	.473	.250	.500	2.9	1.1	.1	**1.4**	4.4
2021–22	Cleveland	2	0	7.4	.200	.000	.667	1.5	.5	.0	.5	2.0
2021–22	Milwaukee	1	0	3.0	.000	—	—	1.0	.0	.0	.0	.0
2021–22	Boston	12	0	7.1	.571	.000	.667	2.1	.7	.3	.2	2.2
2022–23	Boston	69	0	11.7	.665	.231	.821	2.9	.8	.2	.7	3.8
2023–24†	Boston	63	7	15.6	**.700**	**1.000**	**.907**	4.1	1.1	.4	1.0	5.3
2024–25	Boston	**73**	16	18.6	.668	.000	.691	5.3	1.6	.5	1.0	6.0
2025–26	San Antonio	68	**25**	**21.0**	.643	—	.825	**6.1**	**1.9**	.5	1.0	6.5
Career		421	83	15.9	.553	.321	.786	3.9	1.2	.4	.9	5.4

==== Playoffs ====
Year	Team	GP	GS	MPG	FG%	3P%	FT%	RPG	APG	SPG	BPG	PPG
2021	Boston	2	0	2.7	**1.000**	—	.500	1.5	.0	.0	.0	1.5
2022	Boston	9	0	2.1	.750	**1.000**	—	.6	.1	.0	.0	.8
2023	Boston	8	0	4.0	.875	**1.000**	**1.000**	1.3	.0	.0	.1	2.1
2024†	Boston	13	0	10.2	.667	—	.846	3.2	.5	.1	.4	3.0
2025	Boston	11	**1**	**16.4**	.724	—	**1.000**	**3.9**	.5	.5	**1.2**	**4.5**
2026	San Antonio	**23***	**1**	12.9	.569	**1.000**	.773	**3.9**	**.7**	**.6**	.7	3.7
Career		66	1	10.1	.653	1.000	.830	2.9	.4	.3	.5	3.0

=== NBA G League ===
==== Showcase Cup ====
Year	Team	GP	GS	MPG	FG%	3P%	FT%	RPG	APG	SPG	BPG	PPG
2021–22	Maine	10	0	27.4	.506	.314	.455	7.6	3.9	.3	2.6	11.9

==== Regular season ====
Year	Team	GP	GS	MPG	FG%	3P%	FT%	RPG	APG	SPG	BPG	PPG
2017–18	Westchester	**36**	**35**	32.4	.489	.440	**.812**	6.1	2.5	.7	1.7	16.0
2018–19	Westchester	11	11	**32.5**	.514	**.485**	.730	**8.8**	3.6	**.8**	**2.3**	**18.8**
2021–21	Maine	11	8	27.2	**.565**	.286	.800	5.8	**4.5**	.3	1.9	14.9
Career		58	53	31.5	.506	.432	.785	6.6	3.1	.7	1.8	16.3

==== Playoffs ====
Year	Team	GP	GS	MPG	FG%	3P%	FT%	RPG	APG	SPG	BPG	PPG
2018	Westchester	**1**	**1**	32.0	.000	.000	–	5.0	**2.0**	.0	1.0	.0
2019	Westchester	**1**	**1**	**33.0**	**.400**	**.333**	–	**9.0**	**2.0**	**1.0**	**3.0**	**14.0**
Career		2	2	32.5	.250	.167	–	7.0	2.0	.5	2.0	7.0

=== College ===
Year	Team	GP	GS	MPG	FG%	3P%	FT%	RPG	APG	SPG	BPG	PPG
2013–14	Vanderbilt	30	2	15.4	.344	.236	.533	2.3	.8	.3	.6	4.0
2014–15	Vanderbilt	**35**	14	21.6	**.495**	**.400**	.764	3.4	1.1	.2	1.1	8.7
2015–16	Vanderbilt	28	25	27.4	.403	.280	.690	**7.3**	**1.5**	**.5**	**3.0**	8.9
2016–17	Vanderbilt	**35**	**35**	**31.5**	.406	.327	**.857**	6.2	1.2	**.5**	2.0	**13.2**
Career		128	76	24.1	.417	.320	.779	4.8	1.1	.4	1.6	8.9

== Personal life ==
Kornet is the son of former Vanderbilt and NBA player Frank Kornet and Nashville television news anchor Tracy Kornet. His sister Nicole played basketball at Oklahoma and UCLA. He also has a brother named John.

Kornet is a Catholic and maintains a blog of churches he visited during the 2022-23 NBA season. Since then, the blog has expanded to cover a variety of other topics both in sports and society in general. In a March 2026 blog post, Kornet criticized the Atlanta Hawks for planning to honor the Magic City strip club at an upcoming game, stating that strip clubs objectify women. The event was eventually cancelled. Kornet is married to his wife Tierney and has two children as of 2022.
