= 2024 NBA Finals =

North America basketball championship

Team	Coach	Wins
Boston Celtics	Joe Mazzulla	4
Dallas Mavericks	Jason Kidd	1
- Dates: June 6–17
- MVP: Jaylen Brown (Boston Celtics)
- Hall of Famers: Coaches: Jason Kidd (2018, player)
- Eastern finals: Celtics defeated Pacers, 4–0
- Western finals: Mavericks defeated Timberwolves, 4–1

The 2024 NBA Finals was the championship series of the National Basketball Association's (NBA) 2023–24 season and conclusion to the season's playoffs. In the best-of-seven playoffs series, starting on June 6 and concluding on June 17, the Eastern Conference champion Boston Celtics defeated the Western Conference champion Dallas Mavericks four games to one. The Celtics' Jaylen Brown was voted the NBA Finals Most Valuable Player (MVP).

Led by the duo of Jayson Tatum and Brown, the Celtics were seen as favorites for winning the championship, finishing with a league-best 64–18 regular season record and advancing through the playoffs with a 12–2 record. The fifth-seeded Mavericks built around Luka Dončić only became a Finals contender midway through the season after a series of roster changes. The Celtics won the first two games at home to start the series. In Dallas, the Celtics built a large lead in Game 3 which the Mavericks significantly narrowed in the fourth quarter before Boston pulled through with the victory. The Mavericks responded in Game 4 with one of the largest blowout victories in Finals history, but the Celtics won Game 5 in Boston decisively to claim the championship.

With the victory, the Celtics won their first championship since 2008 and their 18th overall, giving them the most championships of any franchise in the NBA. They were the sixth unique champion team in a row in what capped off a historically dominant season and playoffs. They continued to compete behind Brown and Tatum, but let go of many players from the championship team after being eliminated in the 2025 playoffs. Meanwhile, the Mavericks controversially traded away Dončić the next season and entered a rebuild.

== Background ==
This was the first playoff meeting between the Celtics and the Mavericks, as well as for all teams from the Greater Boston and Dallas–Fort Worth areas in any of the four major North American sports leagues. It was also the third Finals appearance for the Celtics where they played a team from Texas, as they previously defeated the Houston Rockets in the 1981 and 1986 Finals. Boston won both their meetings against Dallas in the regular season, and finished 14 games better than the Mavericks in the regular season. The Mavericks were the fifth team in NBA history to reach the Finals without holding home-court advantage in any round, the last team to do so being the eighth-seeded Miami Heat in 2023. Out of those five, only one, the Rockets in 1995, won the championship. Had the Mavericks won, they would have become the 11th NBA team to win multiple championship titles.

=== Boston Celtics ===
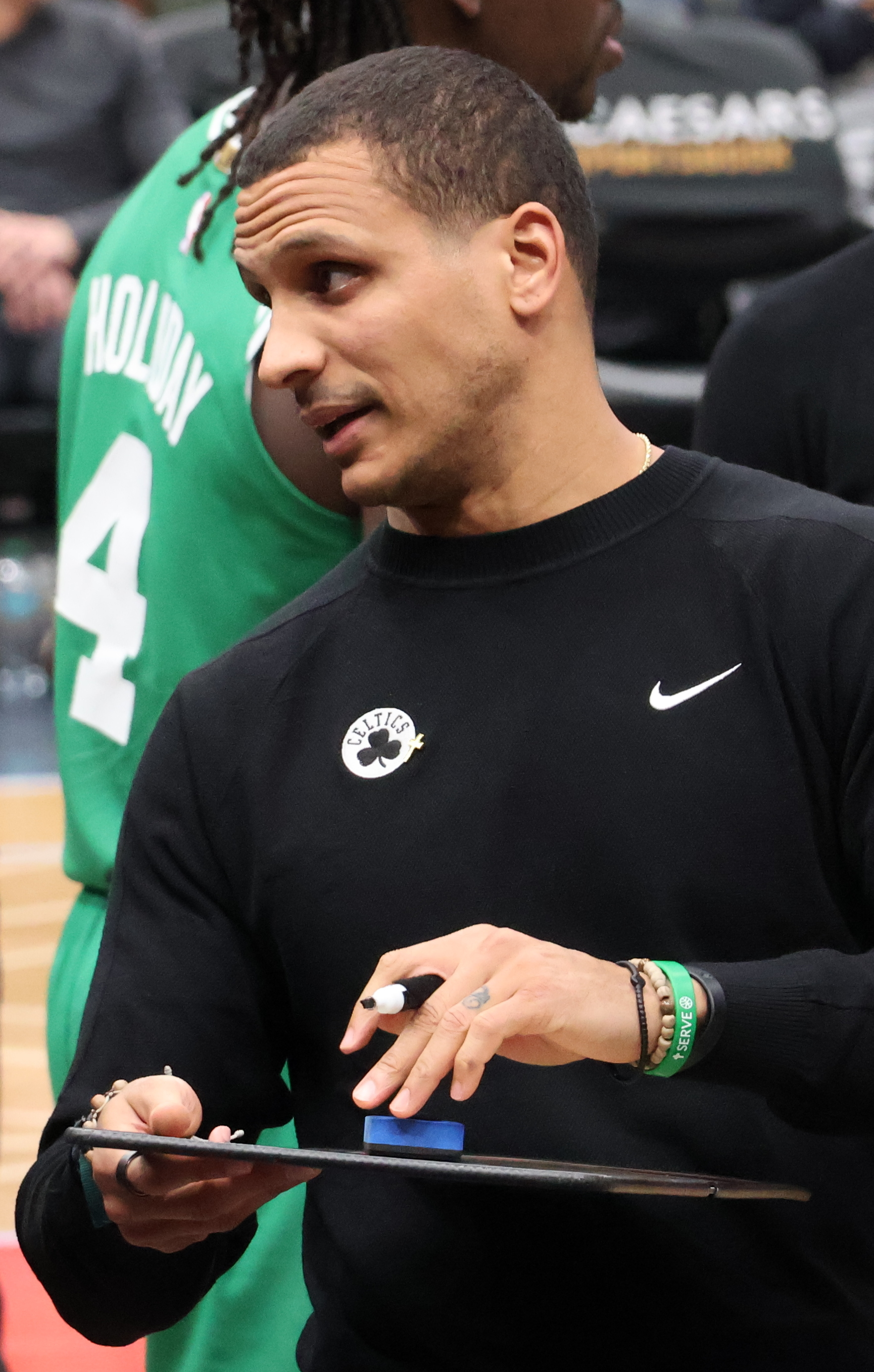
Head coach Joe Mazzulla led the Celtics to the Finals, tying Bill Russell as the youngest ever to do so.

After losing the 2022 NBA Finals to the Golden State Warriors, the Boston Celtics were defeated in the 2023 Eastern Conference Finals in seven games after mounting a failed attempt to overcome a 3–0 series deficit. During the off-season, the Celtics were involved in a trade which sent out longtime guard Marcus Smart in exchange for Kristaps Porziņģis. They also acquired defensive guard Jrue Holiday while trading away Robert Williams III, Malcolm Brogdon and two first-round draft picks. The retooled roster was once again led by the 'Jays', the longtime duo of Jayson Tatum and Jaylen Brown, with support from the two-way backcourt of Holiday and Derrick White and rotating centers Porziņģis and Al Horford.

The Celtics prioritized three-point-shooting offensively while maintaining a versatile roster of defenders. They dominated throughout the season, winning all of their first 20 games at home, permanently occupying the first seed position in the Eastern Conference from mid-November onwards, and finishing with a league-best 64–18 record; the highest Eastern Conference win percentage since the 2012–13 Miami Heat. Boston set numerous records during the season. They had the highest offensive rating in NBA history at 123.2, tied the third-best net rating in NBA history at 11.6, the fifth-widest margin of outscoring their opponents by an average of 11.3 points per game, and the highest points per possession (1.22) in league history. They also had the widest margin of wins between the first and second seeds in the Eastern Conference since 1976 at 14 games.

In the first round of the playoffs, the Celtics faced the Miami Heat in a rematch of the previous year's Eastern Conference Finals, and won the series 4–1. They then faced the Cleveland Cavaliers in the second round, again winning in five games. After sweeping the Indiana Pacers in the Conference Finals they reached the NBA Finals. Due to injuries to key players on all three opposing teams during their run through the Eastern Conference playoffs, the Celtics' path to the Finals was considered by media writers as one of the easiest in NBA history. The Celtics had the best point differential in the playoffs at plus-10, the second-best points-per-game average at 111.4 (behind the Pacers), and allowed the third-lowest points per game for their opponents with 101.3. Even as starting center Porziņģis, who suffered a soleus strain in Game 4 of the first round, was sidelined for the next two rounds, the Celtics went 9–1 without him.

This was the 23rd appearance in the NBA Finals for the Celtics, and their second in three years. Media commentators, analysts, and the Celtics themselves viewed the team as in a "championship or bust" scenario, implying their historically dominant season would be overshadowed if they failed to win the Finals. A Finals victory would give the Celtics their 18th championship, one more than the Los Angeles Lakers for the most in NBA history. Their last victory was in the 2008 NBA Finals, and before then the 1986 Finals. Joe Mazzulla, the 35-year-old head coach appointed by the Celtics a season prior, was tied with Bill Russell as the youngest coach in league history to lead a team to the finals. Russell did so for the Celtics in 1969 as a player-coach. Porziņģis met his former team, the Mavericks, in the Finals, having played for them from 2019 to 2022.

=== Dallas Mavericks ===
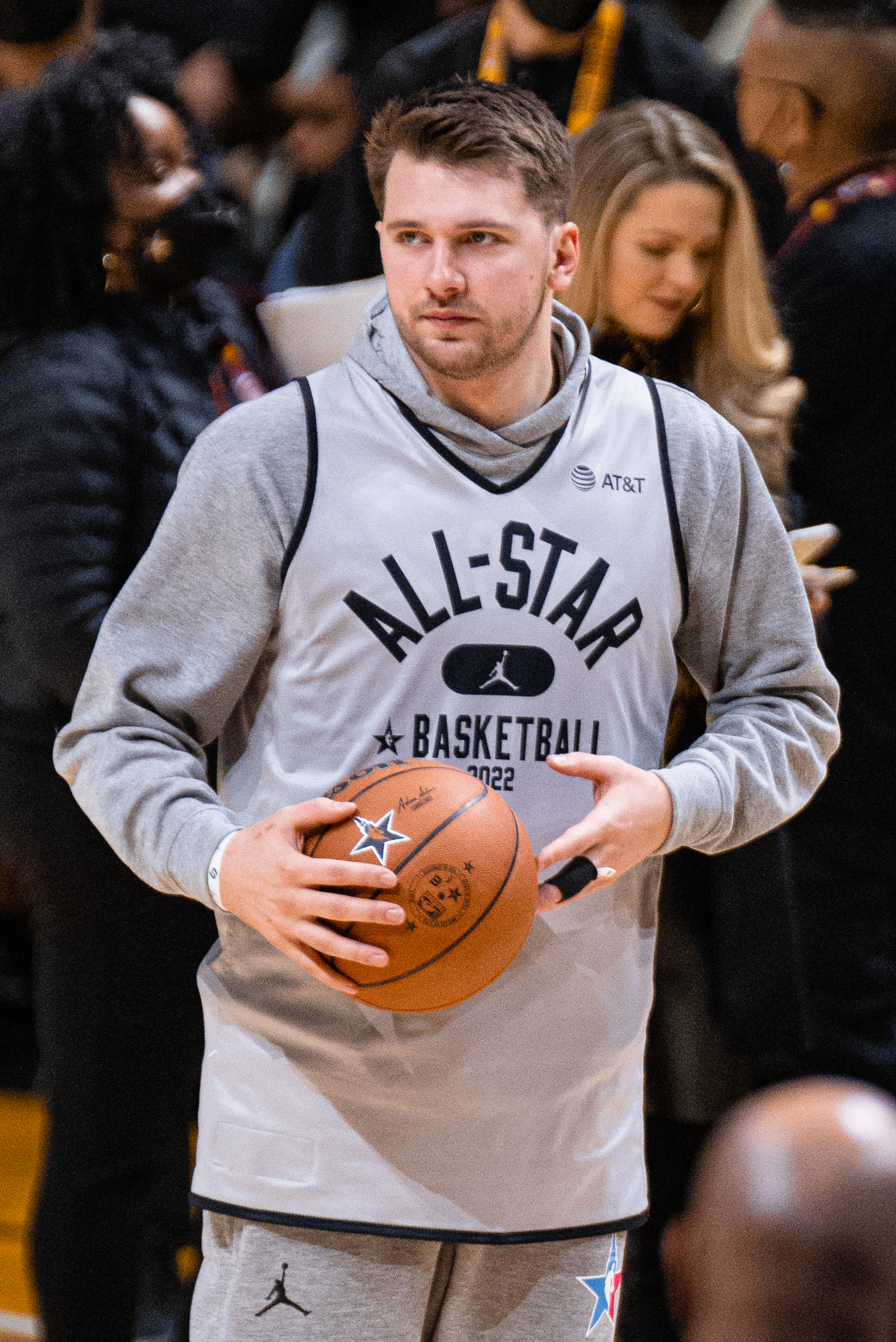
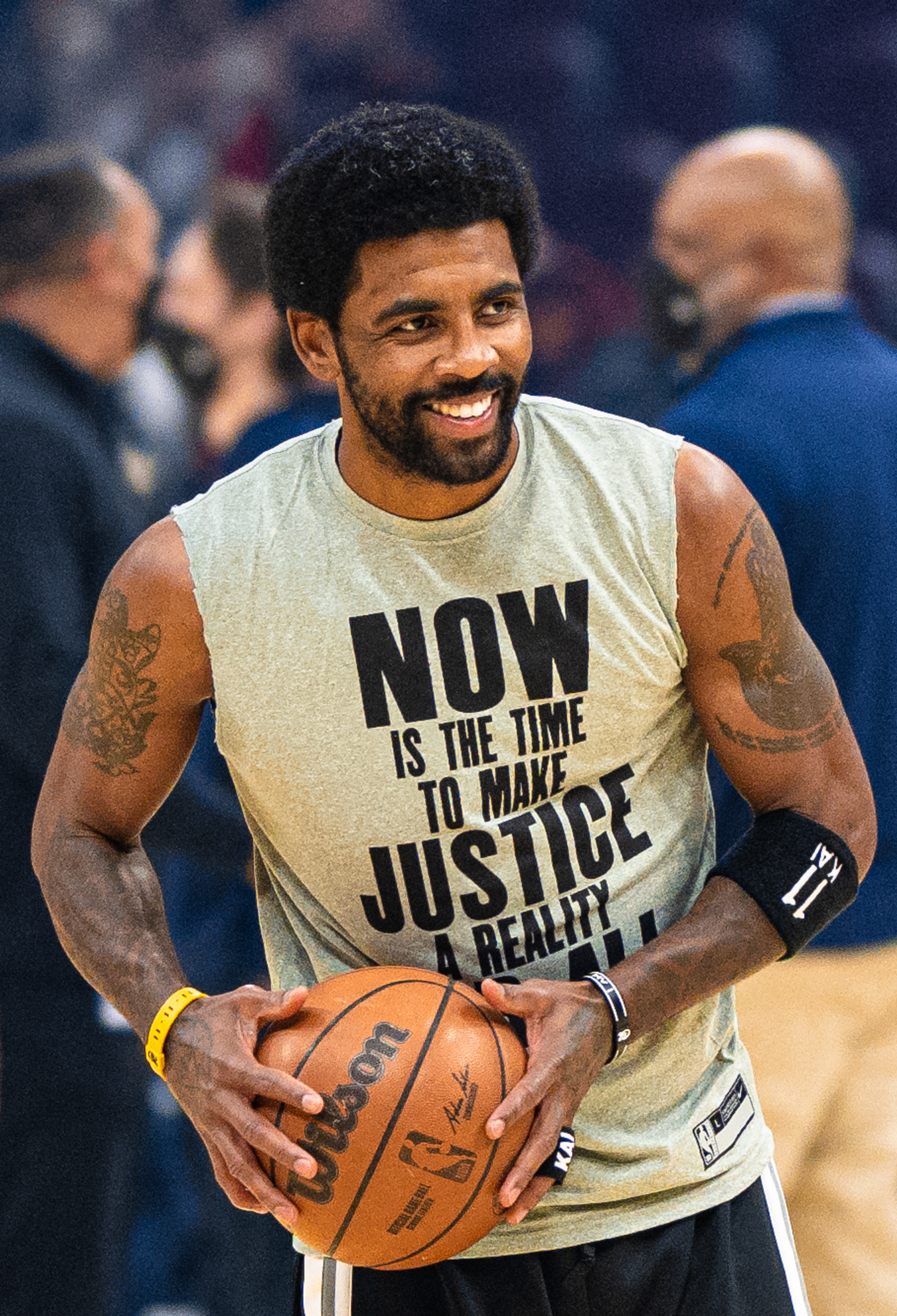
Mavericks stars Luka Dončić (left) and Kyrie Irving (right) were praised as an elite offensive duo during the season.

Despite acquiring star guard Kyrie Irving at the trade deadline the prior season, the Dallas Mavericks missed the 2023 NBA playoffs entirely after finishing as the 11th seed in the Western Conference. Over the off-season, the team reconfigured its roster to center around Irving and Luka Dončić, drafting Dereck Lively II and Olivier-Maxence Prosper, and signing Grant Williams, Seth Curry, Dante Exum and Derrick Jones Jr.

Throughout the 2023–24 season, the backcourt duo of Irving and Dončić was praised by analysts as one of the greatest of all time offensively. Dončić was the scoring leader of the season and finished third in voting for Most Valuable Player, while Irving underwent what was viewed as a renaissance season, averaging 25.6 points on near 50–40–90 shooting percentages. Exum and Jones Jr. provided effective 3-and-D performances, while Lively also played a pivotal role as a big man, making the All-Rookie second team and obtaining the highest field-goal percentage for a rookie season in NBA history at 74.7%. However, Dallas nonetheless struggled through the first half of the season barely above the .500 mark. Until the trade deadline in February, the team was 22nd in defensive rating, 12th in offense and 17th in net rating across the league. Among other roster pieces, Irving and Dončić both missed a significant number of games during that period due to injuries.

At the trade deadline, the Mavericks made more major changes to the roster, exchanging Williams and Curry for power forward P. J. Washington and acquiring center Daniel Gafford. The two players would further complement the Irving–Dončić backcourt by significantly reinforcing the team's defense into a powerhouse. The trade has been regarded as the catalyst for the Mavericks morphing into championship contenders by the next month. From March 7 onwards, the Mavericks had the best defensive rating, the 12th-best offensive rating and the fifth-best net rating in the league, and went 16–4 to end the season. From February 1 onwards, Dallas had a 36–15 record: the second best in the league behind the Celtics. They eventually finished as the fifth seed in the Western Conference with a 50–32 overall record.

In the first round of the playoffs, the Mavericks faced the Los Angeles Clippers, who had eliminated them in two first-round series in the five years prior. The Mavericks won the series in six games. In the second round they faced the first-seeded Oklahoma City Thunder. The Mavericks overcame a 16-point halftime deficit in Game 6 to eliminate the Thunder, advancing to their second Western Conference Finals in three years. After defeating the Minnesota Timberwolves in the first three games of the Conference Finals by a combined margin of 13 points, dropping Game 4, and winning Game 5 in a 21-point blowout, the Mavericks secured their first NBA Finals appearance in 13 years and their third in franchise history. In their last appearance in 2011, the team, which featured current head coach Jason Kidd as point guard, won their first and only title. Like Porziņģis, Irving faced off against a former team of his, the Celtics, whom he played for from 2017 to 2019, having maintained a highly strained relationship with their fan base since his departure. Irving was a combined 0–10 against the Celtics since leaving Boston in free agency.

=== Road to the Finals ===
Eastern Conference
#	Team	W	L	PCT	GB	GP
1	z – Boston Celtics *	64	18	.780	–	82
2	x – New York Knicks	50	32	.610	14.0	82
3	y – Milwaukee Bucks *	49	33	.598	15.0	82
4	x – Cleveland Cavaliers	48	34	.585	16.0	82
5	y – Orlando Magic *	47	35	.573	17.0	82
6	x – Indiana Pacers	47	35	.573	17.0	82
7	x – Philadelphia 76ers	47	35	.573	17.0	82
8	x – Miami Heat	46	36	.561	18.0	82
9	pi – Chicago Bulls	39	43	.476	25.0	82
10	pi – Atlanta Hawks	36	46	.439	28.0	82
11	Brooklyn Nets	32	50	.390	32.0	82
12	Toronto Raptors	25	57	.305	39.0	82
13	Charlotte Hornets	21	61	.256	43.0	82
14	Washington Wizards	15	67	.183	49.0	82
15	Detroit Pistons	14	68	.171	50.0	82

Western Conference
#	Team	W	L	PCT	GB	GP
1	c – Oklahoma City Thunder *	57	25	.695	–	82
2	x – Denver Nuggets	57	25	.695	–	82
3	x – Minnesota Timberwolves	56	26	.683	1.0	82
4	y – Los Angeles Clippers *	51	31	.622	6.0	82
5	y – Dallas Mavericks *	50	32	.610	7.0	82
6	x – Phoenix Suns	49	33	.598	8.0	82
7	x – New Orleans Pelicans	49	33	.598	8.0	82
8	x – Los Angeles Lakers	47	35	.573	10.0	82
9	pi – Sacramento Kings	46	36	.561	11.0	82
10	pi – Golden State Warriors	46	36	.561	11.0	82
11	Houston Rockets	41	41	.500	16.0	82
12	Utah Jazz	31	51	.378	26.0	82
13	Memphis Grizzlies	27	55	.329	30.0	82
14	San Antonio Spurs	22	60	.268	35.0	82
15	Portland Trail Blazers	21	61	.256	36.0	82

Notes

- z – Clinched home court advantage for the entire playoffs
- c – Clinched home court advantage for the conference playoffs
- y – Clinched division title
- x – Clinched playoff spot
- pi – Clinched play-in tournament spot
- * – Division leader

Playoff results
Boston Celtics (Eastern Conference champion)		Dallas Mavericks (Western Conference champion)
Defeated the 8th seeded Miami Heat, 4–1	First round	Defeated the 4th seeded Los Angeles Clippers, 4–2
Defeated the 4th seeded Cleveland Cavaliers, 4–1	Conference semifinals	Defeated the 1st seeded Oklahoma City Thunder, 4–2
Defeated the 6th seeded Indiana Pacers, 4–0	Conference finals	Defeated the 3rd seeded Minnesota Timberwolves, 4–1

=== Regular season series ===
The Celtics won the regular season series 2–0.

January 22, 2024

Recap

Boston Celtics 119, Dallas Mavericks 110

American Airlines Center, Dallas, TX

March 1, 2024

Recap

Dallas Mavericks 110, Boston Celtics 138

TD Garden, Boston, MA

== Series summary ==
Game	Date	Road team	Result	Home team
Game 1	June 6	Dallas Mavericks	89–107 (0–1)	Boston Celtics
Game 2	June 9	Dallas Mavericks	98–105 (0–2)	Boston Celtics
Game 3	June 12	Boston Celtics	106–99 (3–0)	Dallas Mavericks
Game 4	June 14	Boston Celtics	84–122 (3–1)	Dallas Mavericks
Game 5	June 17	Dallas Mavericks	88–106 (1–4)	Boston Celtics

== Game summaries ==
Note: Times are EDT (UTC−4) as listed by the NBA and locally in Boston. For games in Dallas, the local time is also given (CDT, UTC−5).

=== Game 1 ===
ABC

June 6
8:30 pm

Recap

Dallas Mavericks 89, Boston Celtics 107
Scoring by quarter: 20–37, 22–26, 24–23, 23–21
Pts: Luka Dončić 30; Rebs: Luka Dončić 10; Asts: Kyrie Irving 2	Pts: Jaylen Brown 22; Rebs: Jayson Tatum 11; Asts: Holiday, Tatum, White 5 each
Boston leads series, 1–0

TD Garden, Boston, Massachusetts
Attendance: 19,156
Referees:
- No. 15 Zach Zarba
- No. 58 Josh Tiven
- No. 61 Courtney Kirkland

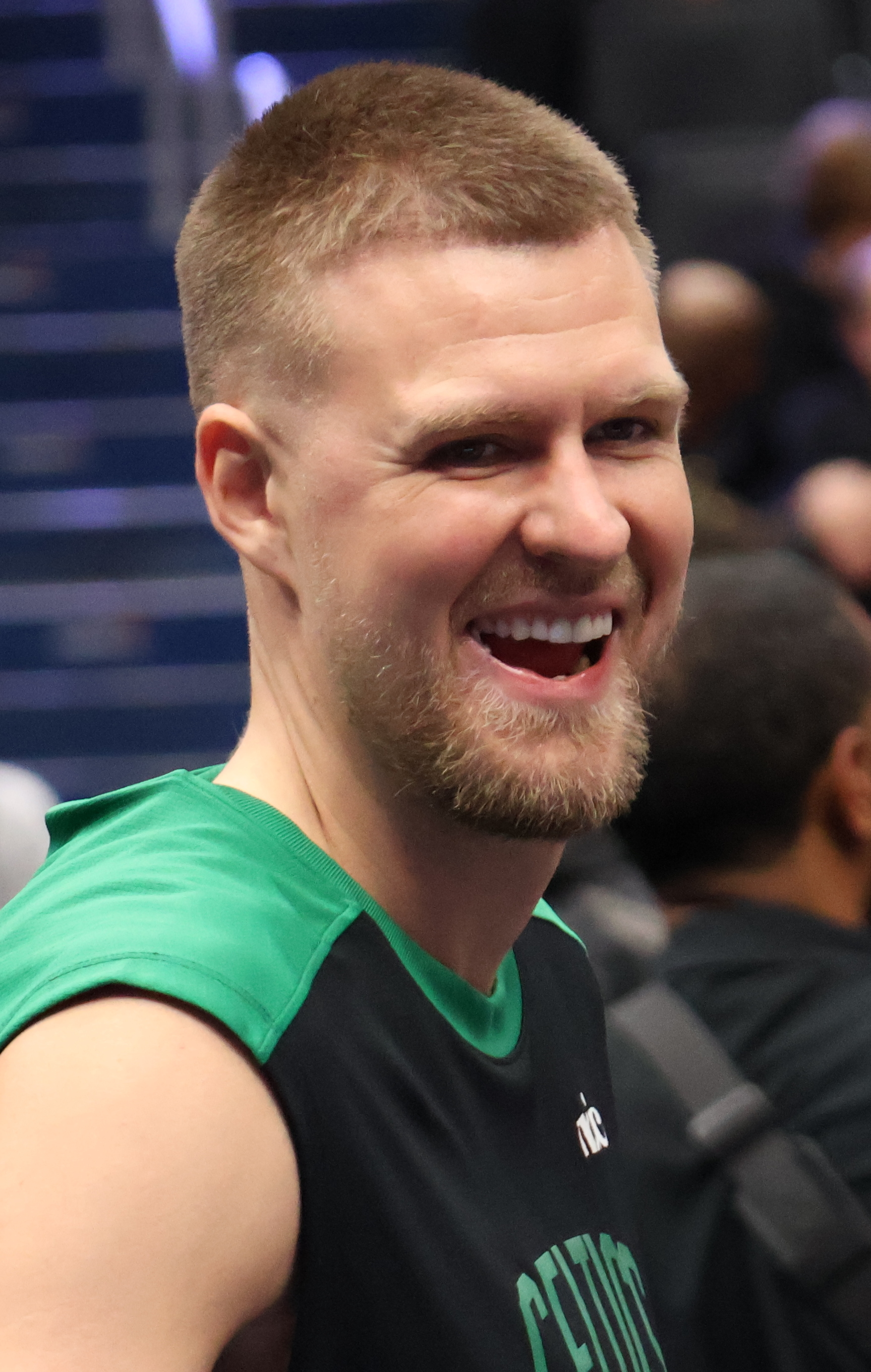
Kristaps Porziņģis returned from a month-long injury to score 20 points for the Celtics, 18 of which came in the first half.

Boston's Kristaps Porziņģis returned from injury after not playing in a game for 38 days and recorded 20 points, six rebounds and three blocks off the bench to help the Celtics achieve a 107–89 victory over the Mavericks. He became the fourth player to score 20 or more points off the bench in their first NBA Finals appearance. Jaylen Brown was the highest scorer for the Celtics, recording 22 points, while Jayson Tatum had 16 points and 11 rebounds and Derrick White had 15 points. Luka Dončić led the Mavericks with 30 points and 10 rebounds, but went 4 of 12 in three-point attempts. P. J. Washington was the next highest Mavericks scorer with 14 points, while Kyrie Irving, who received boos from the crowd whenever he touched the ball, was limited to just 12 points on 6-of-19 overall shooting.

Entering the game off the bench roughly five minutes into the first quarter, only the second time he had done so in his career, Porziņģis scored eight points, forcing Dallas to call an early timeout. He then scored a three-pointer as the Celtics went on a run to end the quarter at 37–20, the largest first quarter point differential in a Game 1 in NBA Finals history. The Celtics continued their momentum into the second quarter, going on a 21–11 run and leading by as much as 29 points before Dončić went on a solo run to end the half at 63–42. Dončić finished the half with 17 points, but no other Mavericks player scored more than six.

In the third quarter, Dončić opened with 10 points early on as the Mavericks went on a 35–14 run to cut the Celtics lead to eight with 4:27 left in the quarter. After Joe Mazzulla called a timeout, the Celtics went on a 14-point unanswered run to take a commanding lead by the end of the quarter. The Mavericks were crippled offensively, shooting 25.9% from the three-point-line, suffering 11 turnovers and recording only five assists across the first three quarters, the fewest for any NBA team in the last three seasons. Boston meanwhile became the first team to have seven players make multiple three-pointers in a Finals game.

A moment of silence was held before the game in memory of Bill Walton, the two-time NBA champion—including in 1986 with the Celtics as their sixth man—and broadcaster, who died on May 27 of colorectal cancer at the age of 71. Walton's family was in attendance, and the Celtics players wore black shooting shirts bearing Walton's name with a tie-dye background while their jerseys had a black band with his name on the shoulder. Celtics team staff wore pins with a similar Walton tie-dye.

=== Game 2 ===
ABC

June 9
8:00 pm

Recap

Dallas Mavericks 98, Boston Celtics 105
Scoring by quarter: 28–25, 23–29, 23–29, 24–22
Pts: Luka Dončić 32; Rebs: Luka Dončić 11; Asts: Luka Dončić 11	Pts: Jrue Holiday 26; Rebs: Jrue Holiday 11; Asts: Jayson Tatum 12
Boston leads series, 2–0

TD Garden, Boston, Massachusetts
Attendance: 19,156
Referees:
- No. 25 Tony Brothers
- No. 10 John Goble
- No. 55 Bill Kennedy

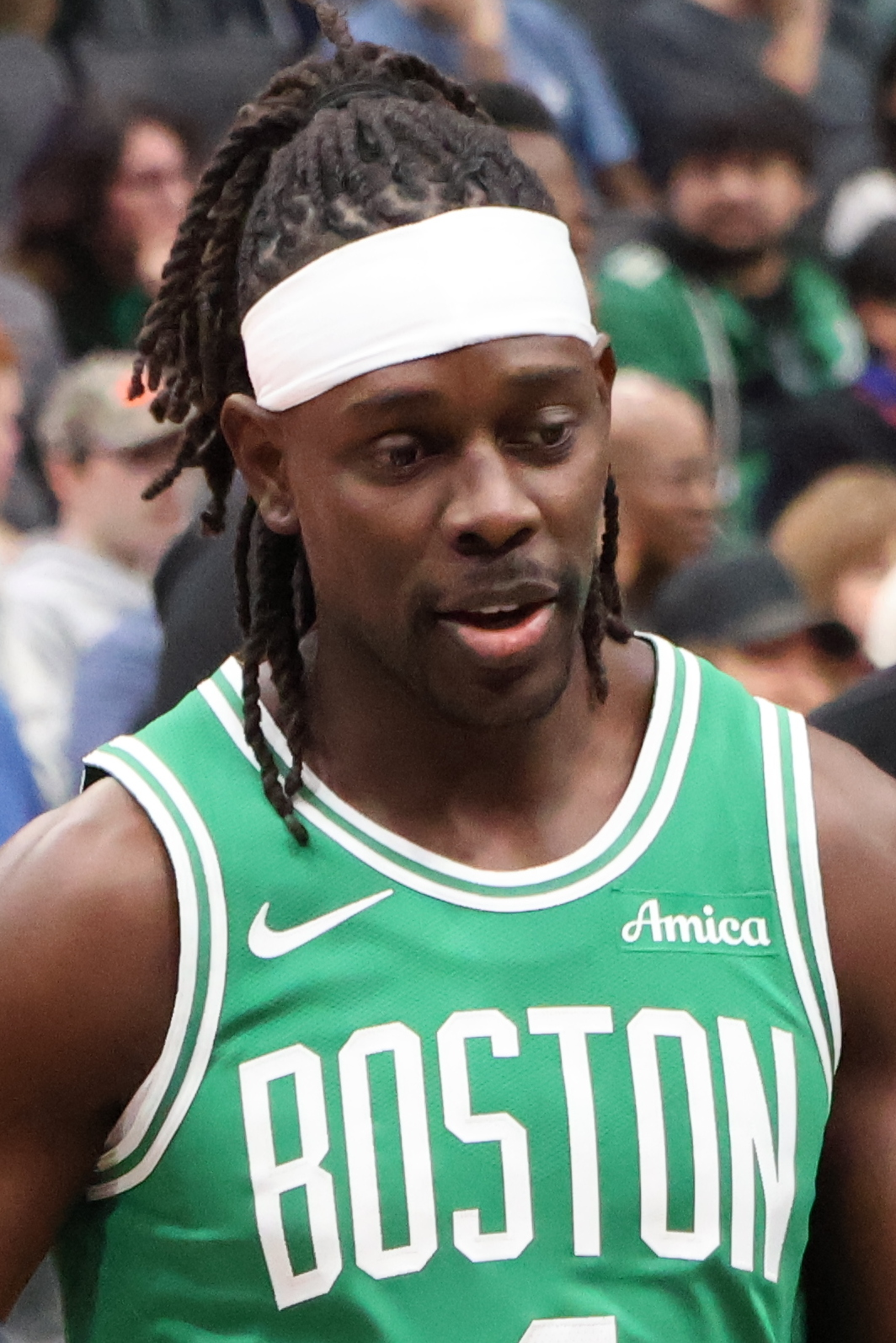
Veteran guard and first-year Celtic Jrue Holiday led the team with 26 points and 11 rebounds.

Jrue Holiday led the Celtics with 26 points and 11 rebounds as Boston hung on for a 105–98 win to take a 2–0 lead in the series. Jaylen Brown and Derrick White scored 21 and 18 points, respectively, with three steals each, while Jayson Tatum had 18 points, nine rebounds and 12 assists. Luka Dončić, who was listed as questionable prior to the game, notched 32 points, 11 rebounds and 11 assists, becoming the first Maverick to record a triple-double in the Finals and one of four NBA players to record one with 30-plus points in a loss. Kyrie Irving had 16 points and six assists, but his poor shooting was underscored by the fact that he had yet to make a three-pointer in the series.

The Mavericks were ahead throughout the entire first quarter and finished with a three-point lead, but the Celtics established a three-point lead of their own by halftime. Dallas struggled with missed free throws, while the Celtics struggled equally through poor three-point shooting, missing their first eight three-point attempts and going 10 of 39 across the entire game. The Celtics kept their lead secure during the third quarter, capping it off with a buzzer beater by Payton Pritchard from near half-court to extend the margin to nine by the fourth.

During the fourth quarter, the Celtics initially pushed their lead further to 14 points, but the Mavericks in return went on a 9–0 run, capped off by Dončić recording a three-point play, to cut the lead down to five with 1:15 remaining. Boston's troubles were further compounded as Porziņģis suffered a knee injury unrelated to his previous injury and was taken out. Off a fast break produced by Derrick Jones Jr.'s block on Tatum, P. J. Washington had a chance to cut the lead down further before White blocked his attempted dunk, allowing Brown to score a layup on the other end of the court. Dončić attempted a difficult three-pointer with 28 seconds left but failed to make it, sealing a Celtics victory. He attributed his team's loss to his missed free throws and turnovers, of which he had eight, five occurring in the second half.

=== Game 3 ===
ABC

June 12
8:30 pm (7:30 pm CDT)

Recap

Boston Celtics 106, Dallas Mavericks 99
Scoring by quarter: 30–31, 20–20, 35–19, 21–29
Pts: Jayson Tatum 31; Rebs: Jaylen Brown 8 Asts: Jaylen Brown 8	Pts: Kyrie Irving 35; Rebs: Dereck Lively II 13; Asts: Luka Dončić 6
Boston leads series, 3–0

American Airlines Center, Dallas, Texas
Attendance: 20,311
Referees:
- No. 8 Marc Davis
- No. 19 James Capers
- No. 24 Kevin Scott

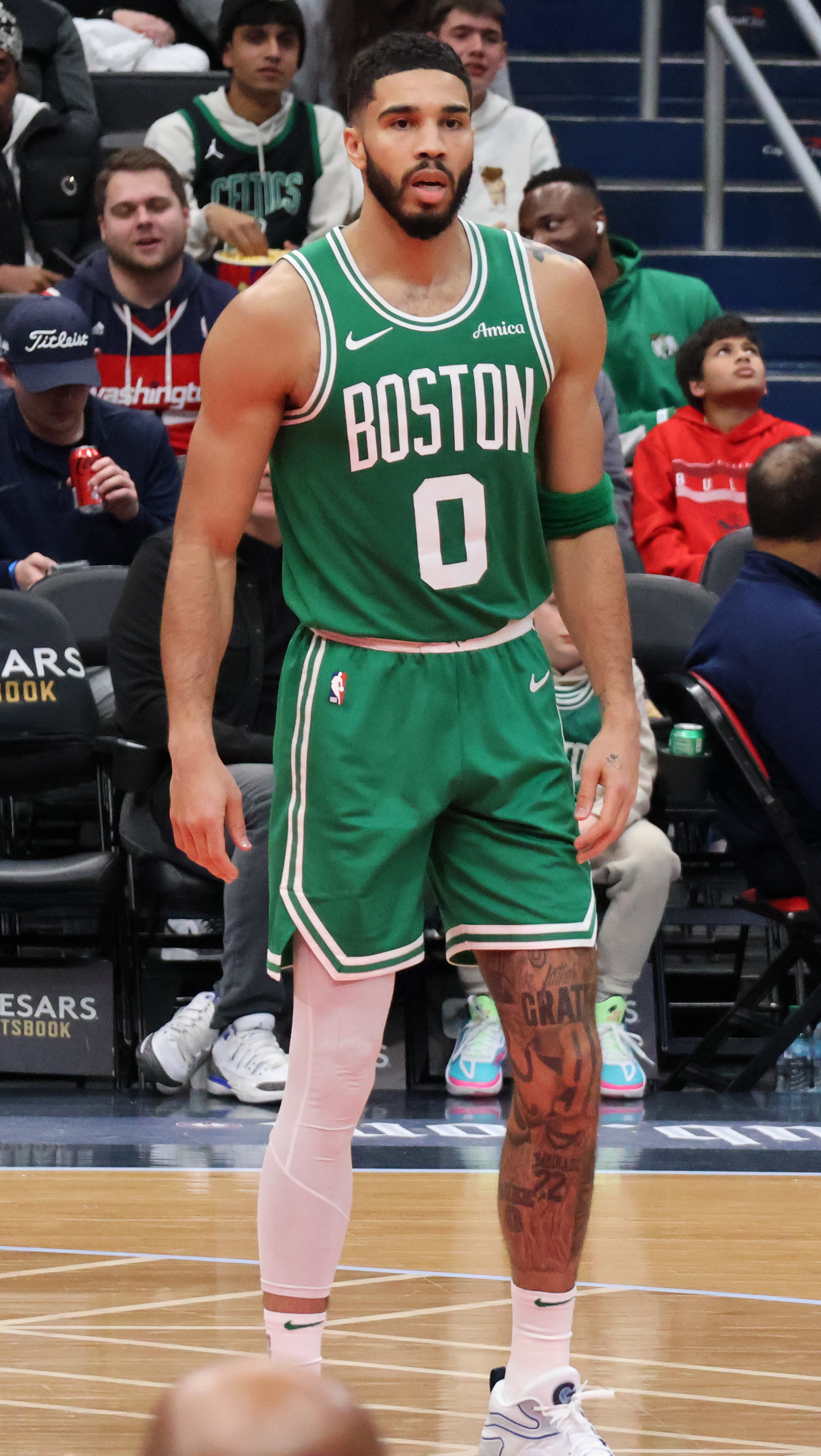
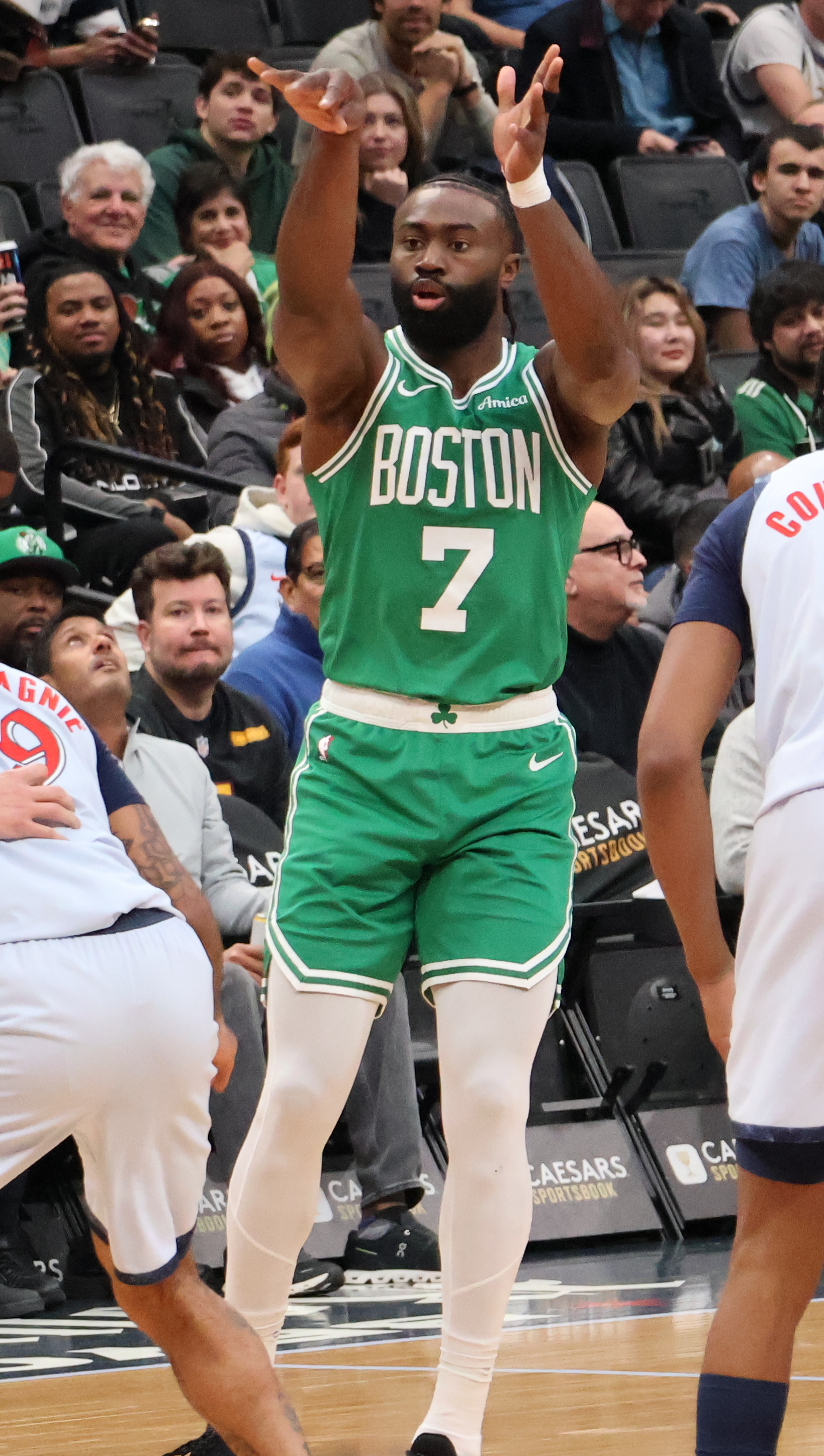
Jayson Tatum (left) and Jaylen Brown (right) scored 31 and 30 points respectively to secure a 3–0 series lead for the Celtics.

Jayson Tatum and Jaylen Brown scored 31 and 30 points to stave off a late-game Mavericks rally and put the Celtics up 3–0 in the series. It was the second time in franchise history that two players each scored 30-plus points in a Finals game. Tatum logged six rebounds and five assists while Brown had eight rebounds and eight assists, with the victory extending Boston's playoff winning-streak to 10 and its road-game winning-streak to seven. The only other Celtic to score in double-figures was Derrick White, who had 16 points. Kyrie Irving led all scorers with 35 points, while Luka Dončić had 27 points, six rebounds and six assists. Coming into the game, the Celtics were without the injured Kristaps Porziņģis, who was replaced by Al Horford and occasionally Xavier Tillman at the center position. The Mavericks, specifically Irving and Dončić, took advantage of the lack of size for Boston to attack the rim, outscoring Boston 52–36 from the area during the game.

The Mavericks started strong, scoring nine points to force a timeout from the Celtics early on. The Mavericks heavily utilized the paint to outscore the Celtics 22–9 by the midpoint of the quarter—their largest lead in the series by that point. The Celtics responded with a 21–9 run led by Brown and Tatum. The second quarter was defense-oriented at first, with the Celtics leading the scoring 5–2 at the halfway mark before Irving and Tatum began responding to each other's three-pointers, ending the half at a near tie. The Celtics dominated the third quarter, scoring on their first seven possessions to establish an imposing lead as Brown scored half of his points in the game during the timeframe. After Dončić made a layup to bring the lead down to six with 5:11 remaining, the Celtics went on a 7–0 run to end the quarter with a 15-point lead, outscoring the Mavericks 35–19 in total.

Up until the final quarter, the Mavericks, excluding Irving and Dončić, combined for only 19 points. The Celtics initially continued their offensive momentum into the fourth quarter, capitalized by a three-pointer from White a minute in to extend the lead to 21 points. However, the Mavericks proceeded to go on a 22–2 run, with contributions from P. J. Washington and Dereck Lively II, cutting the deficit to 93–90. During this stretch, Dončić fouled out with 4:12 remaining. Lively later scored a dunk to put the Celtics lead at 100–98 until Brown hit a mid-range jump shot with 1:01 left. Sam Quinn of CBS Sports retrospectively viewed Brown's shot as "the dagger that won that contest for Boston." From there, Washington, Irving, and Tim Hardaway Jr. each missed their three-point attempts as a foul on Tatum with 14.6 seconds left allowed him to make free throws to secure the game and preventing what would have tied the largest comeback from a fourth-quarter deficit in NBA history.

As was done for Bill Walton prior to Game 1, a moment of silence was held before the game for Jerry West, who died earlier that same day at the age of 86. West's silhouette was the basis for the NBA logo, and he was an NBA champion as a player in 1972 with the Los Angeles Lakers and also a further eight times as an executive with the Lakers and Golden State Warriors.

=== Game 4 ===
ABC

June 14
8:30 pm (7:30 pm CDT)

Recap

Boston Celtics 84, Dallas Mavericks 122
Scoring by quarter: 21–34, 14–27, 25–31, 24–30
Pts: Jayson Tatum 15; Rebs: Jayson Tatum 5 Asts: Al Horford 4	Pts: Luka Dončić 29; Rebs: Dereck Lively II 12; Asts: Kyrie Irving 6
Boston leads series, 3–1

American Airlines Center, Dallas, Texas
Attendance: 20,277
Referees:
- No. 48 Scott Foster
- No. 16 David Guthrie
- No. 60 James Williams

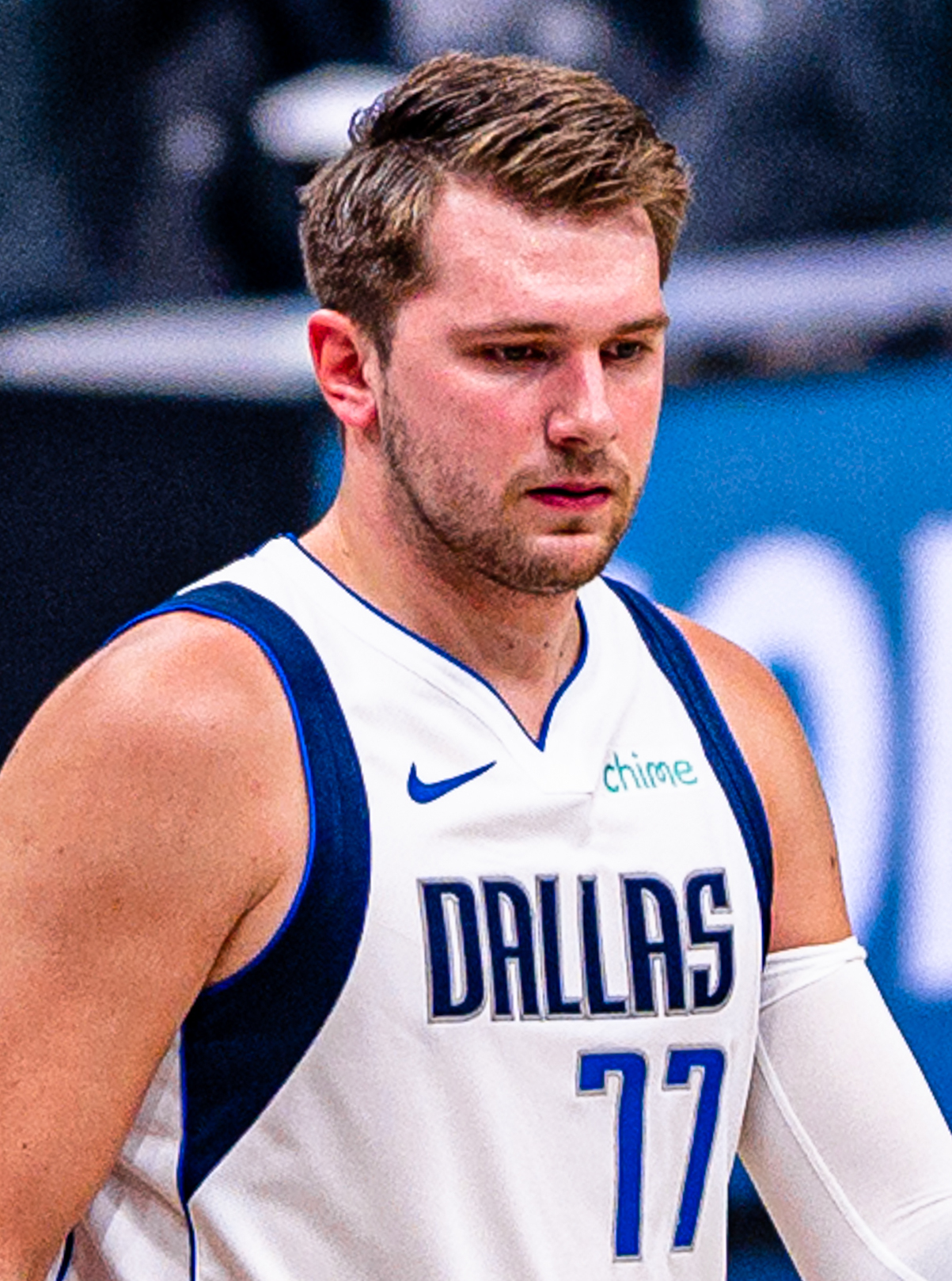
A blowout Mavericks victory spearheaded by Luka Dončić's 29 points prevented a series sweep by the Celtics.

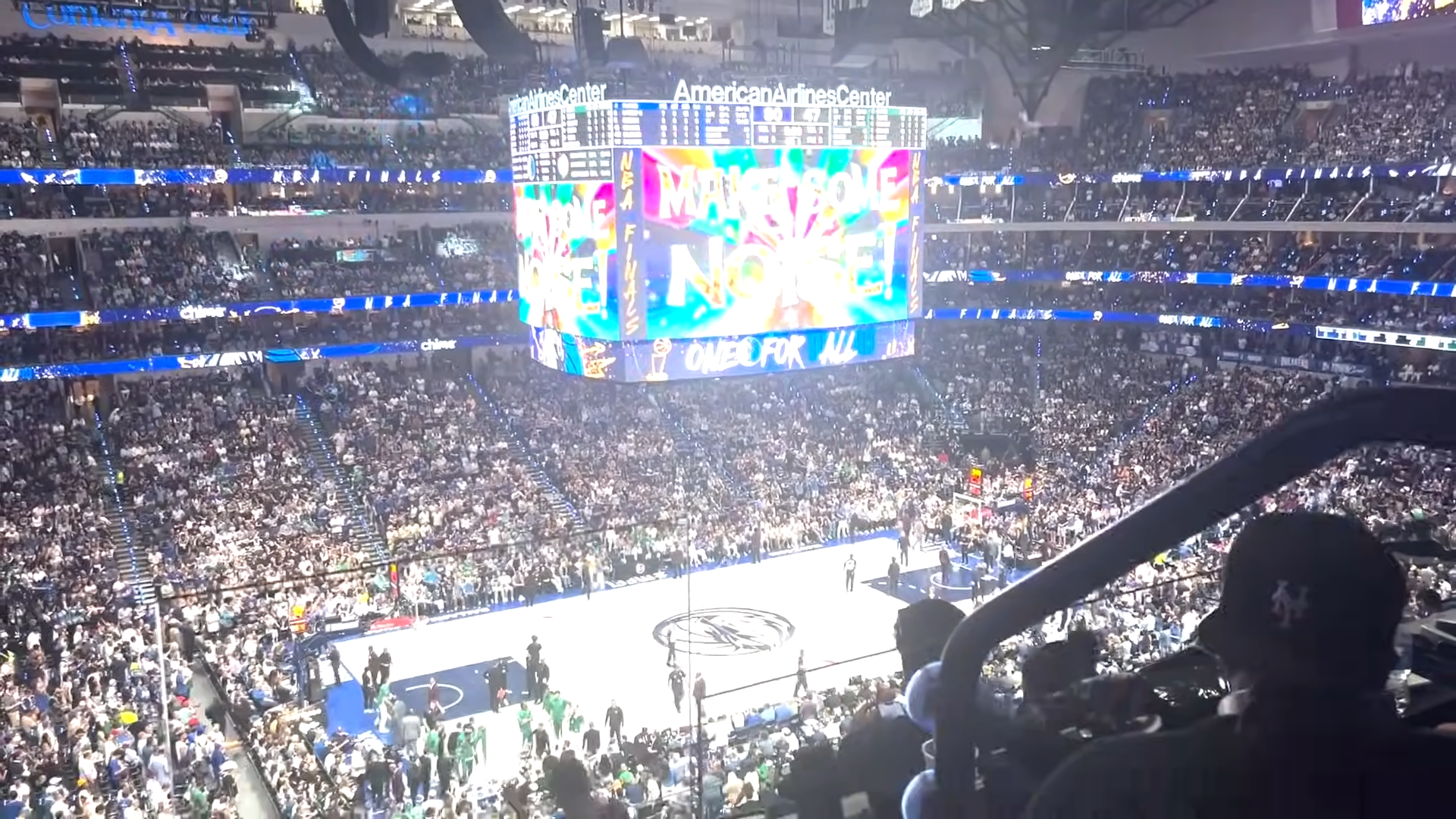
A timeout during Game 4

The Mavericks avoided a sweep by the Celtics with a 122–84 blowout victory—the third largest in NBA Finals history—to cut Boston's series lead to 3–1. Luka Dončić led Dallas with 29 points, five rebounds, five assists and three steals. He scored 25 of his total points in the first two quarters, the most ever recorded by a Maverick in a Finals game by halftime. Kyrie Irving had 21 points and six assists, and Tim Hardaway Jr. had 15 points off five three-pointers in the fourth quarter, becoming the third player to have scored five threes in a single quarter of a Finals game. Dereck Lively II had 11 points and 12 rebounds, becoming the second player to achieve multiple double-doubles in the Finals at the age of 20.

Midway through the first quarter, Lively scored his first career three-pointer which gave the Mavericks the lead for the rest of the game. The Mavericks established a 13-point lead by the end of the first, and a 26-point lead by the half, the fourth largest in Finals history. At halftime, the only Celtics players who made more than one field goal were Jayson Tatum and Jaylen Brown. The Mavericks continued their momentum into the third quarter, outscoring the Celtics by 15–7 points within the first 4:32. With 3:18 left in the third quarter and the deficit at 36 points, the Celtics ceded defeat by substituting out his starters, which was soon followed by the Mavericks doing the same.

It was the Celtics' largest defeat of the season and their worst overall since the 2017 Eastern Conference Finals. It ended a 10-game postseason winning streak and seven-game road streak, and avoided the chance of them becoming the first team in NBA history to sweep both the Conference Finals and the Finals. The 84 points they scored was the lowest tally of the season, while the game-high 48 points the Mavericks led by was their largest deficit. The 35 points they scored by half was their lowest in two seasons, and the second lowest in a Finals game in franchise history. Tatum and Brown finished with 15 and 10 points respectively.

=== Game 5 ===
ABC

June 17
8:30 pm

Recap

Dallas Mavericks 88, Boston Celtics 106
Scoring by quarter: 18–28, 28–39, 21–19, 21–20
Pts: Luka Dončić 28; Rebs: Luka Dončić 12; Asts: Kyrie Irving 9	Pts: Jayson Tatum 31; Rebs: Jrue Holiday 11; Asts: Jayson Tatum 11
Boston wins NBA Finals, 4–1

TD Garden, Boston, Massachusetts
Attendance: 19,156
Referees:
- No. 15 Zach Zarba
- No. 10 John Goble
- No. 55 Bill Kennedy

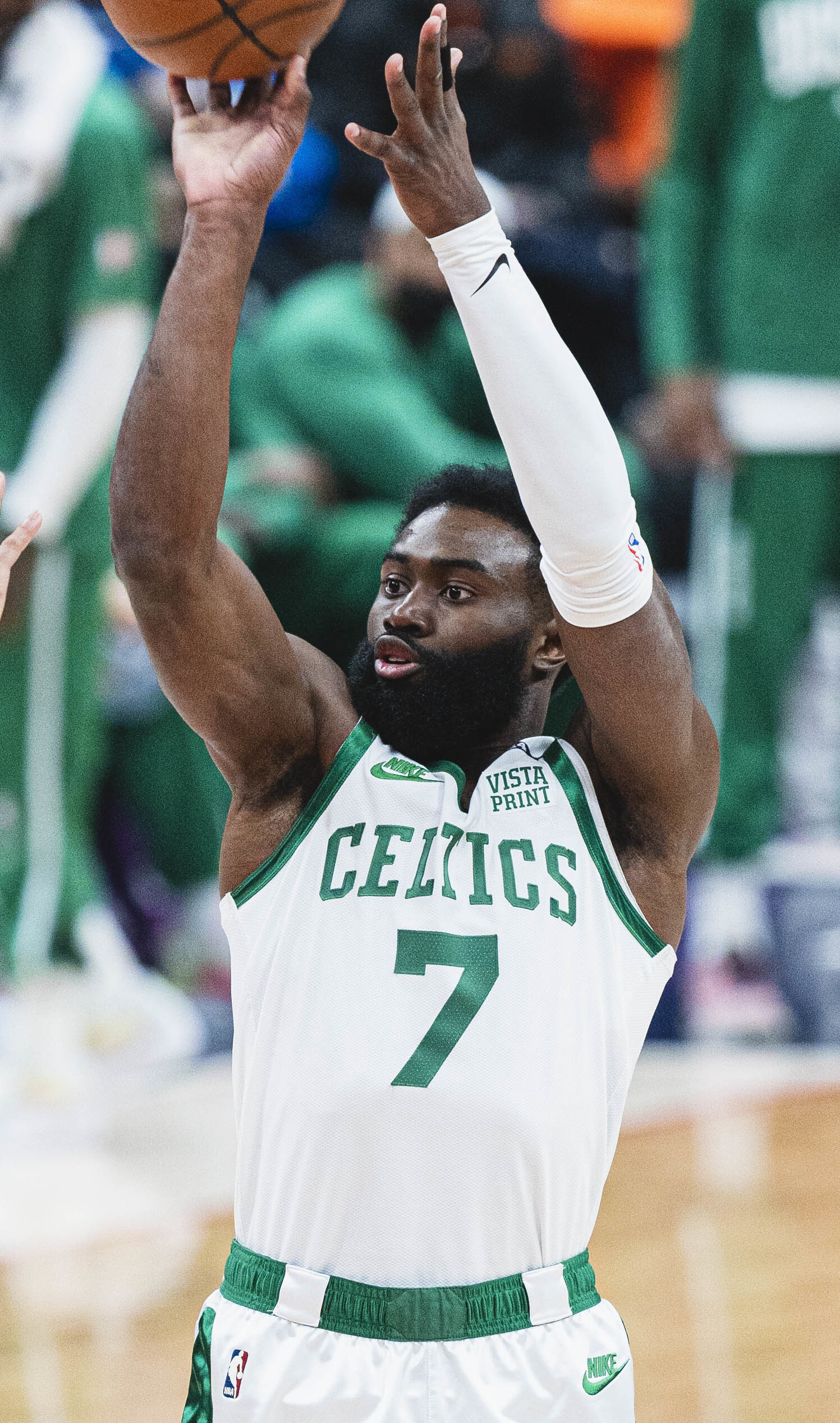
Jaylen Brown was awarded Finals MVP after averaging 20.8 points, 5.4 rebounds, and 5 assists per game in the series.

The Celtics closed out the series in a dominant 106–88 victory at home to claim the NBA championship. Jayson Tatum led them to victory with 31 points, eight rebounds and 11 assists, while Jaylen Brown had 21 points, eight rebounds and six assists. Jrue Holiday, who had 14 points and 11 rebounds, scored the first three field goals of the game for the Celtics. Playing through an injury that he suffered in Game 2 and sidelined him in Games 3 and 4, Kristaps Porziņģis checked in midway through the first quarter to a standing ovation. He finished with five points in 16 minutes.

The Mavericks managed to cut the lead to a single point midway through the first quarter, but the Celtics responded with a 12–3 run powered by eight points between Tatum and Brown. Dallas once again attempted a comeback in the second quarter by bringing a 15-point lead down to nine, but Boston proceeded to outscore them 19–7. The Celtics finished the first half with a 21-point lead, which culminated with Payton Pritchard's buzzer-beating half-court shot, the longest made field goal in the Finals since at least 1998. The Mavericks never recovered or led at any point during the game, with the Celtics extending their lead to as much as 26 points in the third quarter. Yahoo Sports dubbed the fourth quarter a "coronation" for the Celtics.

Luka Dončić led the Mavericks with 28 points, 12 rebounds, five assists, and three steals. He missed his first six three-pointers and finished 2 of 9 from that range. Further noted was his poor defensive performance and his seven turnovers. Nonetheless, he ended the series averaging 29.2 points, 8.8 rebounds and 5.6 assists, leading all players in points per game. Similar to the first two games, Kyrie Irving struggled and finished with 15 points on 5 of 16 shooting. With Dončić and Irving struggling early the Mavericks had no response. The Celtics had a 51–35 rebounding advantage and went 17 of 20 (85%) on their free throws line compared to the Mavericks' 7 of 13 (53.8%).

With the conclusion of the Finals, Brown was named the NBA Finals Most Valuable Player after averaging 20.8 points, 5.4 rebounds, and 5.0 assists per game. This was in spite of Tatum, generally considered the best player on the Celtics, leading him in most statistical categories with 22.2 points, 7.8 rebounds, and 7.2 assists per game. Brown's performance as the primary defender on Dončić was regarded as a major factor in the series, as he limited his three-point shooting to 24.4% and significantly inhibited his playmaking, with his assists dropping from 9.8 per game in the regular season. Brown also had a higher field goal percentage (44%) compared to Tatum (38.8%) and made important shots throughout the series. Both Brown and Tatum said the winner of the award did not matter to them as their goal was to win the championship, each emphasizing each other's and the team's accomplishment.

== Rosters ==
=== Boston Celtics ===
2023–24 Boston Celtics roster
Players

Pos.	No.	Player	Height	Weight	DOB	From
F	12	Oshae Brissett	6 ft 7 in (2.01 m)	210 lb (95 kg)	1998-06-20	Syracuse
G/F	7	Jaylen Brown	6 ft 6 in (1.98 m)	223 lb (101 kg)	1996-10-24	California
G	20	JD Davison (TW)	6 ft 1 in (1.85 m)	195 lb (88 kg)	2002-10-03	Alabama
F	30	Sam Hauser	6 ft 7 in (2.01 m)	217 lb (98 kg)	1997-12-08	Virginia
G	4	Jrue Holiday	6 ft 4 in (1.93 m)	205 lb (93 kg)	1990-06-12	UCLA
F/C	42	Al Horford	6 ft 9 in (2.06 m)	240 lb (109 kg)	1986-06-03	Florida
C	40	Luke Kornet	7 ft 2 in (2.18 m)	250 lb (113 kg)	1995-07-15	Vanderbilt
G/F	50	Sviatoslav Mykhailiuk	6 ft 7 in (2.01 m)	205 lb (93 kg)	1997-06-10	Kansas
F	13	Drew Peterson (TW)	6 ft 9 in (2.06 m)	205 lb (93 kg)	1999-11-09	USC
F/C	8	Kristaps Porziņģis	7 ft 3 in (2.21 m)	240 lb (109 kg)	1995-08-02	Latvia
G	11	Payton Pritchard	6 ft 1 in (1.85 m)	195 lb (88 kg)	1998-01-28	Oregon
C	88	Neemias Queta	7 ft 0 in (2.13 m)	248 lb (112 kg)	1999-07-13	Utah State
G	44	Jaden Springer	6 ft 4 in (1.93 m)	202 lb (92 kg)	2002-09-25	Tennessee
F	0	Jayson Tatum	6 ft 8 in (2.03 m)	210 lb (95 kg)	1998-03-03	Duke
F/C	26	Xavier Tillman	6 ft 7 in (2.01 m)	245 lb (111 kg)	1999-01-12	Michigan State
G/F	27	Jordan Walsh	6 ft 6 in (1.98 m)	205 lb (93 kg)	2004-03-03	Arkansas
G	9	Derrick White	6 ft 4 in (1.93 m)	190 lb (86 kg)	1994-07-02	Colorado

Coaches
Head coach
- Joe Mazzulla
Assistant(s)
- Sam Cassell
- Tony Dobbins
- Amile Jefferson
- Charles Lee
- D. J. MacLeay
- Matt Reynolds

Legend
- (DP) Unsigned draft pick
- (FA) Free agent
- (S) Suspended
- (GL) On assignment to G League affiliate
- (TW) Two-way affiliate player
- Injured

Roster
Updated: April 16, 2024

=== Dallas Mavericks ===
2023–24 Dallas Mavericks roster
Players

Pos.	No.	Player	Height	Weight	DOB	From
F	13	Greg Brown III (TW)	6 ft 7 in (2.01 m)	206 lb (93 kg)	2001-09-01	Texas
G/F	77	Luka Dončić	6 ft 7 in (2.01 m)	230 lb (104 kg)	1999-02-28	Slovenia
G	0	Dante Exum	6 ft 5 in (1.96 m)	214 lb (97 kg)	1995-07-13	Australia
F	3	Alex Fudge (TW)	6 ft 8 in (2.03 m)	200 lb (91 kg)	2003-06-05	Florida
F/C	21	Daniel Gafford	6 ft 10 in (2.08 m)	234 lb (106 kg)	1998-10-01	Arkansas
G/F	8	Josh Green	6 ft 5 in (1.96 m)	200 lb (91 kg)	2000-11-16	Arizona
G/F	10	Tim Hardaway Jr.	6 ft 5 in (1.96 m)	205 lb (93 kg)	1992-03-16	Michigan
G	1	Jaden Hardy	6 ft 3 in (1.91 m)	198 lb (90 kg)	2002-07-05	Coronado HS (NV)
G	11	Kyrie Irving	6 ft 2 in (1.88 m)	195 lb (88 kg)	1992-03-23	Duke
F	55	Derrick Jones Jr.	6 ft 6 in (1.98 m)	210 lb (95 kg)	1997-02-15	UNLV
F	42	Maxi Kleber	6 ft 10 in (2.08 m)	240 lb (109 kg)	1992-01-29	Germany
G	9	A. J. Lawson	6 ft 6 in (1.98 m)	179 lb (81 kg)	2000-07-15	South Carolina
C	2	Dereck Lively II	7 ft 1 in (2.16 m)	230 lb (104 kg)	2004-02-12	Duke
F	88	Markieff Morris	6 ft 9 in (2.06 m)	245 lb (111 kg)	1989-09-02	Kansas
F/C	7	Dwight Powell	6 ft 10 in (2.08 m)	240 lb (109 kg)	1991-07-20	Stanford
F	18	Olivier-Maxence Prosper	6 ft 7 in (2.01 m)	230 lb (104 kg)	2002-07-03	Marquette
F	25	P. J. Washington	6 ft 7 in (2.01 m)	230 lb (104 kg)	1998-08-23	Kentucky
G	00	Brandon Williams (TW)	6 ft 1 in (1.85 m)	190 lb (86 kg)	1999-11-22	Arizona

Coaches
Head coach
- Jason Kidd
Assistant(s)
- Darrell Armstrong
- Josh Broghamer
- Jared Dudley
- Eric Hughes
- Alex Jensen
- Marko Milič
- God Shammgod
- Sean Sweeney
- Keith Veney

Legend
- (DP) Unsigned draft pick
- (FA) Free agent
- (S) Suspended
- (GL) On assignment to G League affiliate
- (TW) Two-way affiliate player
- Injured

Roster
Updated: March 31, 2024

== Player statistics ==
Legend
GP	Games played	GS	Games started	MPG	Minutes per game
FG%	Field-goal percentage	3P%	3-point field-goal percentage	FT%	Free-throw percentage
RPG	Rebounds per game	APG	Assists per game	SPG	Steals per game
BPG	Blocks per game	PPG	Points per game

Dallas Mavericks statistics
Player	GP	GS	MPG	FG%	3P%	FT%	RPG	APG	SPG	BPG	PPG
Luka Dončić	5	5	38.8	.472	.244	.586	**8.8**	**5.6**	**2.6**	0.0	**29.2**
Kyrie Irving	5	5	**39.0**	.414	.276	**1.000**	3.0	5.0	0.6	0.0	19.8
P. J. Washington	5	5	32.6	.409	.273	.750	6.2	1.4	0.0	**0.6**	10.8
Daniel Gafford	5	5	14.8	**.727**	—	.667	4.4	0.4	0.2	**0.6**	8.0
Derrick Jones Jr.	5	5	23.2	.433	.250	.800	2.8	0.6	0.6	**0.6**	6.6
Dereck Lively II	5	0	22.8	.706	**1.000**	.429	8.2	0.4	0.8	0.2	5.6
Josh Green	5	0	19.4	.450	.545	.500	2.8	0.6	0.4	0.0	5.4
Jaden Hardy	5	0	6.5	.438	.400	.833	1.2	1.0	0.0	0.0	4.2
Tim Hardaway Jr.	4	0	11.9	.333	.417	—	1.5	0.3	0.3	0.0	3.8
Dante Exum	5	0	8.2	.700	.667	.500	1.0	0.4	0.2	0.0	3.8
Markieff Morris	1	0	12.0	.200	.333	—	4.0	0.0	0.0	0.0	3.0
Maxi Kleber	5	0	15.9	.250	.167	**1.000**	1.4	0.6	0.2	0.2	1.8
A. J. Lawson	2	0	5.3	.500	—	—	0.0	0.0	0.0	0.0	1.0
Dwight Powell	3	0	5.2	—	—	—	1.3	0.7	0.0	0.0	0.0
Olivier-Maxence Prosper	2	0	4.0	.000	—	—	1.5	0.5	0.0	0.0	0.0

Boston Celtics statistics
Player	GP	GS	MPG	FG%	3P%	FT%	RPG	APG	SPG	BPG	PPG
Jayson Tatum	5	5	**40.2**	.388	.263	.926	**7.8**	**7.2**	1.0	0.6	**22.2**
Jaylen Brown	5	5	38.5	.440	.235	.733	5.4	5.0	**1.6**	0.8	20.8
Jrue Holiday	5	5	37.8	.536	.421	**1.000**	7.4	3.8	0.6	0.6	14.4
Derrick White	5	5	36.7	.389	.395	**1.000**	4.8	2.6	1.2	1.0	13.8
Al Horford	5	5	30.0	.520	.471	.500	6.2	2.6	1.2	0.6	7.0
Kristaps Porziņģis	3	0	20.0	.583	.222	.875	3.7	0.3	0.0	**1.7**	12.3
Sam Hauser	5	0	15.5	.519	.478	**1.000**	3.0	0.6	0.2	0.0	8.2
Payton Pritchard	5	0	12.4	.250	.188	—	1.4	1.6	0.2	0.0	3.4
Xavier Tillman	2	0	9.3	.667	**1.000**	**1.000**	2.5	0.5	0.0	1.0	3.0
Oshae Brissett	3	0	6.2	.500	**1.000**	**1.000**	1.0	0.0	0.0	0.3	2.3
Neemias Queta	1	0	5.4	**1.000**	—	—	0.0	0.0	0.0	1.0	2.0
Sviatoslav Mykhailiuk	3	0	4.4	.250	.200	—	0.7	0.0	0.0	0.0	1.7
Luke Kornet	3	0	5.1	.500	—	—	0.7	0.7	0.3	0.0	0.7
Jaden Springer	1	0	8.0	.000	—	—	2.0	0.0	0.0	0.0	0.0
Jordan Walsh	1	0	5.4	.000	.000	—	1.0	0.0	0.0	0.0	0.0

- Bold: team high

== Media coverage ==
The Finals was televised in the United States by ABC (including local affiliates WCVB-TV in Boston and WFAA in Dallas) for the 22nd consecutive year. Like before, lead play-by-play broadcaster Mike Breen and sideline reporter Lisa Salters called the NBA Finals. With longtime analysts Jeff Van Gundy and Mark Jackson being laid off by ESPN, Doris Burke and Doc Rivers were hired as analysts on the lead broadcast team. This made Burke the first woman to serve as a television analyst for a major men's professional championship event. The trio of Breen, Burke, and Rivers were to call the NBA Finals. However, with Rivers being hired as the head coach of Milwaukee Bucks, JJ Redick was enlisted as a replacement to Rivers for the NBA Finals team. Following the conclusion of the Finals, however, Redick was hired as head coach of the Los Angeles Lakers.

The Finals was broadcast on ESPN Radio with Marc Kestecher and P. J. Carlesimo as commentators, as well as Jorge Sedano as the reporter. This was the first Finals since 2019 without Doris Burke as a radio commentator.

=== Viewership ===
Game 1 was, excluding the COVID-19 pandemic-affected 2020 and 2021 editions, the least-watched opening match for the Finals since 2007, with its 10.99 million viewers being a 5% decrease in average viewership from the previous Finals and an 8% decrease from the last Celtics appearance in 2022. Game 2 saw a 10% increase in viewership from the first game, making it the best-performing Game 2 since 2019. Game 3 received slightly less viewers than the previous game while being a 2% increase compared to its predecessor in 2023. With the Celtics holding a 3–0 series lead, Game 4 received only 9.62 million viewers, making it the second least-watched game of its kind since tracking began, only behind the 2020 edition. Game 5 closed the series out with an averaged 12.2 million viewers, giving the overall series an average rating of 5.8 and a viewership of 11.31 million, approximately a 3% decrease from the 2023 edition. Some commentators blamed the rather disappointing viewership on the assortment of blowouts that characterized several of the games.

Game	Ratings (American households)	American audience (in millions)	Ref
1	5.7	10.99	
2	6.2	12.31	
3	6.0	11.43	
4	4.7	9.62	
5	6.3	12.22	
Avg	5.8	11.315	

== Impact ==
=== Celebration ===
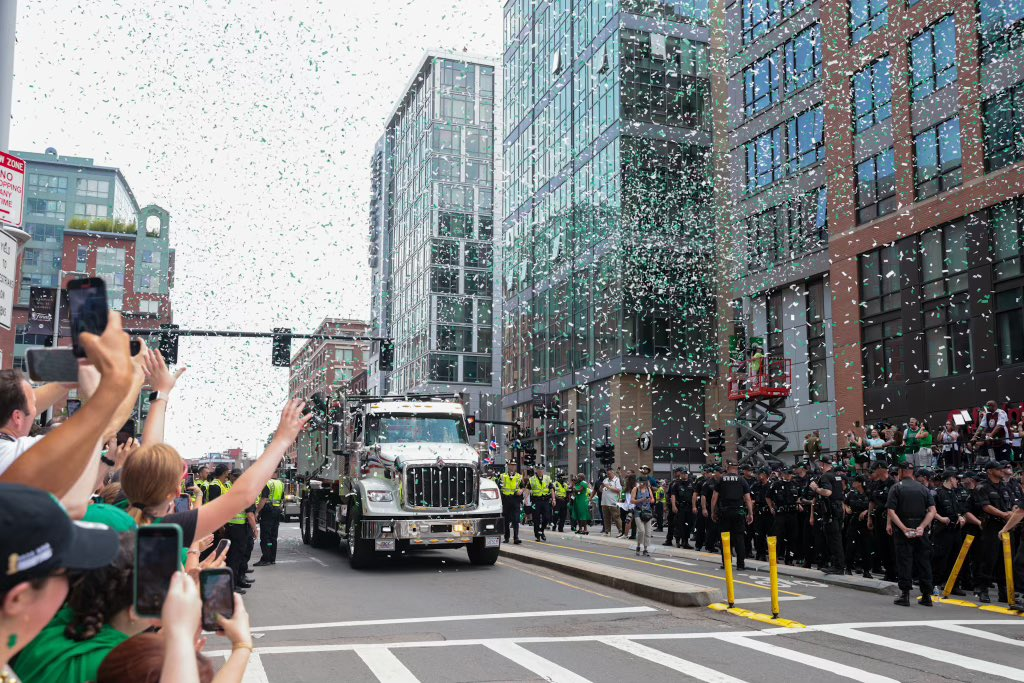
The Celtics convoy heading down a street during the victory parade in Boston

Boston Mayor Michelle Wu announced on June 18, 2024, the details for a parade celebrating the Celtics victory, scheduled to take place at 11:00 a.m on June 21. The team would ride the city's traditional ceremonial duck boats starting "in front of TD Garden on Causeway Street, passing by City Hall Plaza and the Boston Common on Tremont Street and ending on Boylston Street by the Hynes Convention Center." On the scheduled day, the celebration first included a rally at TD Garden featuring the Celtics players and their relatives, organization and arena staff, season ticket holders and notables including Mayor Wu and Massachusetts governor Maura Healey. The parade then began at 11:15 a.m. and concluded around 90 minutes later. Estimates for the parade's turnout reported at least over 1 million people, with the MBTA Commuter Rail claiming ridership "on par with 5 days of regular weekday ridership condensed into 5–6 hours."

=== Records and achievements ===
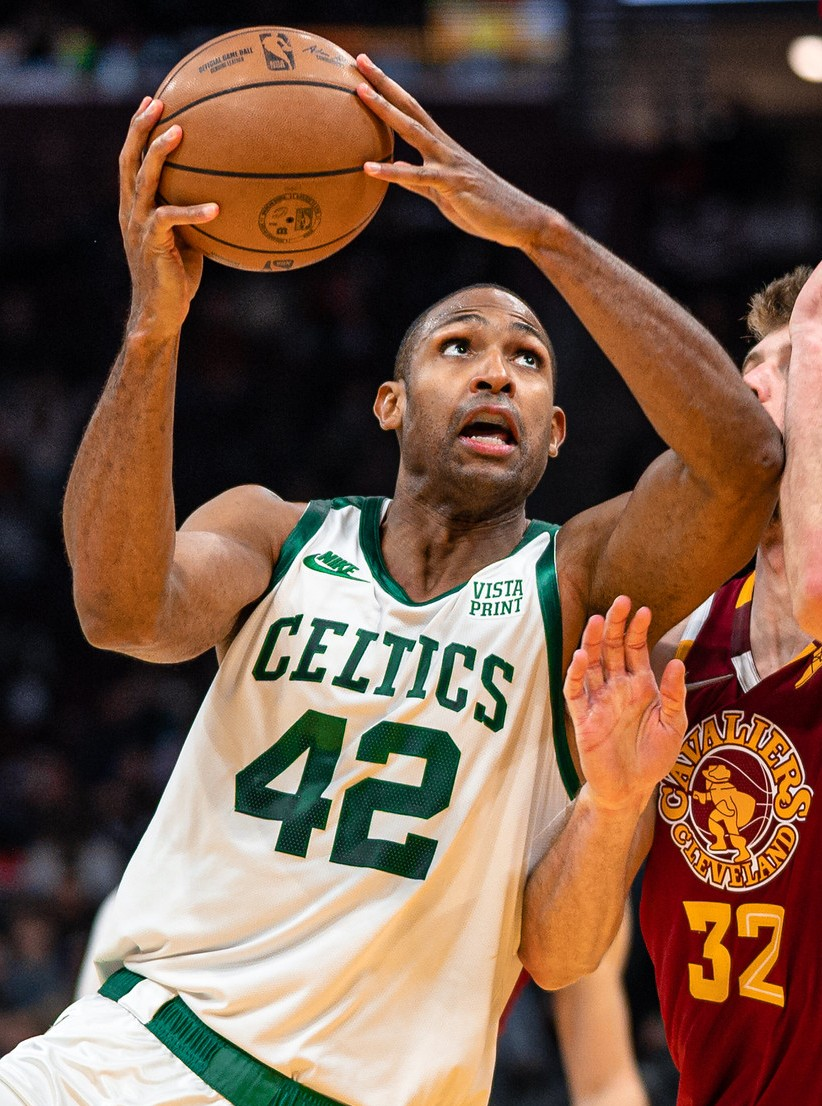
Among the many Celtics who won their first NBA championship is Al Horford, who had previously played 186 playoff games without one.

The Celtics' victory gave them their 18th franchise championship, allowing them to surpass the Los Angeles Lakers, who they were tied with since 2020, as the franchise with the most championships in the NBA. The victory ended the second-longest franchise drought without a championship at 16 years. The Celtics claimed the 13th championship title this century for a team from the big four sports leagues (the NBA, MLB, NFL and NHL) based in the Boston area. The Celtics were the sixth unique champion team in a row, the longest such parity streak in NBA Finals history since 1975–1980. It was the first NBA Finals that the Celtics played in that did not go six or seven games since 1965.

The Celtics finished with a combined 80–21 record including the regular season and the playoffs, and a .792 winning percentage, the second highest in franchise history behind the 1985–86 Celtics season. Until their victory, the Celtics played more postseason games over an eight-season span without winning an NBA title than any team in the history of the NBA. With the win, the Celtics finished with the second-best postseason record (16–3) since the NBA went to four best-of-seven rounds of the playoffs in 2003, only behind the 2016–17 Golden State Warriors, who went 16–1. (Note: This record was later tied by the 2025–26 New York Knicks.) Speculation arose of the team potentially becoming a dynasty.

Aside from Jrue Holiday, who won a title with the Milwaukee Bucks in 2021, every player on the Celtics won their first championship. Al Horford set a record for the most playoff games without an NBA championship before winning one with 186. Only Karl Malone has played more career playoff games (193) without winning a championship. Tatum and Brown's 107 playoff games played together represent the most by a duo prior to winning their first championship in NBA history. Among the many international players on the Celtics, Horford, Porziņģis and Neemias Queta represent the first Dominican-, Latvian-, and Portuguese-born players respectively to win a championship. For the coaching staff, this represented head coach Joe Mazzulla, and assistant coaches Anthony Dobbins, Amile Jefferson, D. J. MacLeay and Matt Reynolds's first NBA championship—as well as the second for Charles Lee (2021), and fourth for Sam Cassell (1994, 1995, 2008 as a player). It also represented the first championship for 2023–24 NBA Executive of the Year Award winner Brad Stevens, and the culmination of a ten-year rebuild that began when he originally joined the Celtics in 2013 as the head coach.

The NBA playoff pool was at a record $33,657,947 (USD), which is distributed to each of the 16 playoff teams. Boston's share of the NBA's playoff pool prior to the victory was $7,202,498. By clinching the championship they tacked on another $4,856,937 in winnings, bringing their total to $12,059,435, the most a team has ever won from the postseason bonus money pool. Dallas' share ended up at $5,899,422. The victory triggered a contractual bonus of $1,183,200 for Holiday. In total, Holiday's achievements in his first season with the Celtics netted him around $2.8 million, which represents every incentive bonus in his contract.

Playing for the US Men's Basketball team later that summer, Jrue Holiday, Jayson Tatum and Derrick White would join Khris Middleton (2021), Kyrie Irving (2016), LeBron James (2012), Scottie Pippen (1996, 1992) and Michael Jordan (1992) as the only players to win an NBA Finals and Olympic gold medal in the same year. Holiday also joined Pippen as the only players to accomplish this feat twice.

== Aftermath ==
=== Celtics ===
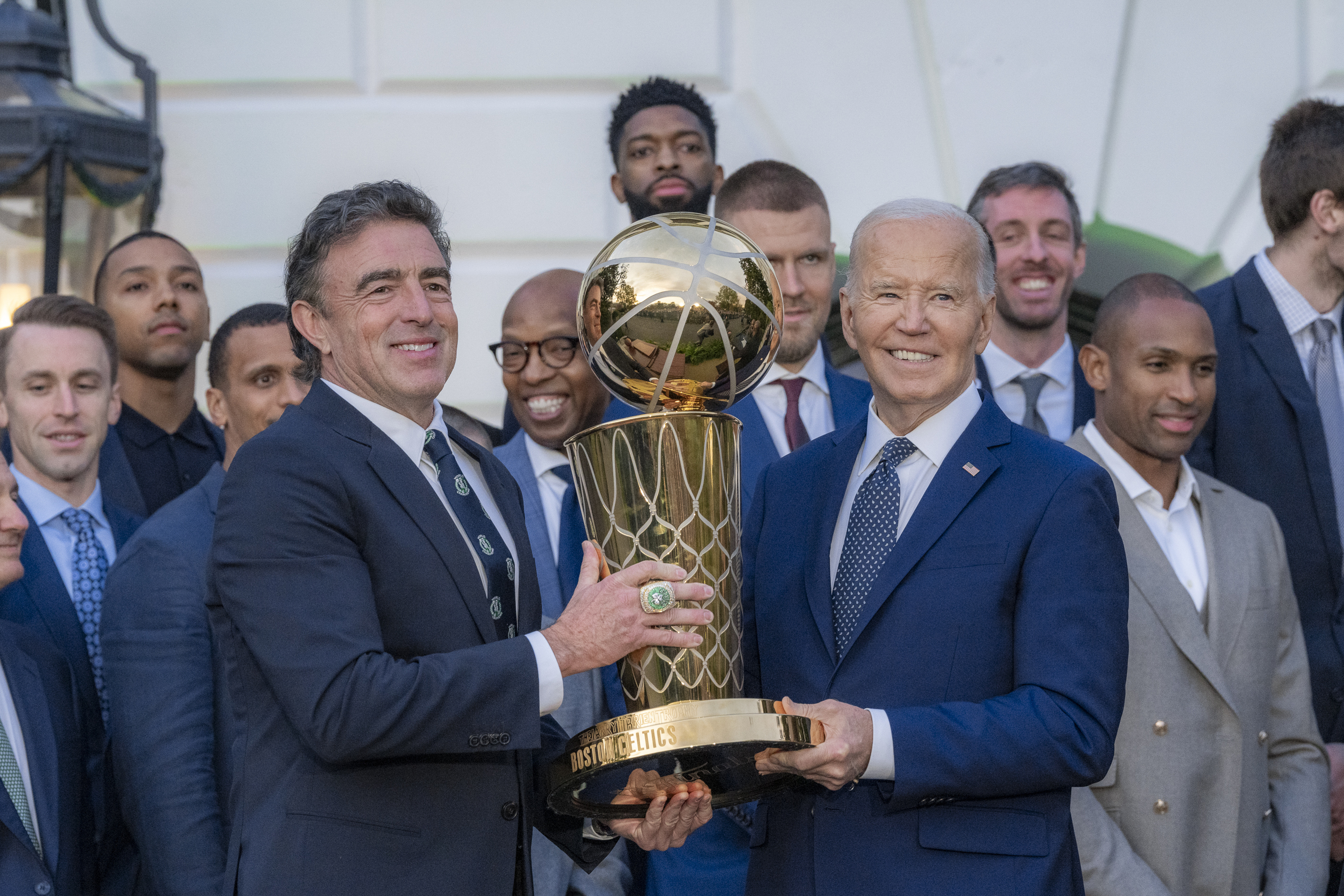
Owner Wyc Grousbeck and United States president Joe Biden holding the Larry O'Brien trophy during the Celtics visit to the White House in 2024.

On July 1, 2024, fifteen days after winning the championship, Celtics owner Wyc Grousbeck put the team up for sale. In March 2025, they were sold for $6.1 billion to a group led by private equity executive Bill Chisholm. It was the largest sale of an NBA franchise until the Los Angeles Lakers surpassed the mark a few months later.

The Celtics were unable to defend their NBA title the next season despite being favourites to do so, making it the seventh straight season the NBA did not have a repeat champion—the longest such stretch in league history. Boston was defeated in the Eastern Conference semifinals by the New York Knicks in six games, during which Jayson Tatum tore his Achilles tendon. With key players such as Al Horford, Kristaps Porziņģis, and Luke Kornet leaving the team in the offseason, the 2025–26 season was expected by some to be a "gap year". The new roster exceeded expectations and the Celtics finished as the second seed, with Jaylen Brown being viewed as a MVP candidate and Tatum returning from his injury ahead of schedule in March. They were eliminated by the Philadelphia 76ers in the first round of the playoffs in seven games after blowing a 3–1 series lead. This ended the Jays-era for the Celtics, as Jaylen Brown was traded to the 76ers for Paul George and draft pick compensation in the off-season.

=== Mavericks ===
[Jayson Tatum] is the reason why Luka got traded. He shut him down in the finals. What he did to Luka in the Finals, shutting him down, guarding him full court, making it unbearable offensively, led Dallas to start questioning Luka as the leader of the team, and questioning whether he was in shape or not.

— NBA insider Marc Spears

Luka Dončić received criticism for his defensive performance during the Finals despite his offensive prowess. ESPN sportswriter Brian Windhorst harshly criticized his defense and complaining to officials during Game 3, calling it "unacceptable" and stating it was costing the Mavericks the series. Windhorst said, "If Luka's ever gonna be a winner... he's gonna have to use [this Finals] as a learning experience".

The following 2024–25 season, the Mavericks traded away Dončić to the Los Angeles Lakers for Anthony Davis in a highly publicized midseason trade. Windhorst suggested the Mavericks were displeased by Dončić's performance in the Finals as he was never confronted by members of the organization after his Game 3 comments. NBA insider Marc Spears cited Jayson Tatum's performance against Dončić on both ends as the catalyst to the Mavericks rethinking their commitment to him.

Injuries to Davis and Kyrie Irving led to the Mavericks becoming the first team since the 2019–20 Golden State Warriors to miss the playoffs after reaching the NBA Finals the previous season. The Mavericks received the first overall pick in the 2025 NBA draft, against 1.8 percent draft lottery odds, and took star forward Cooper Flagg. General manager Nico Harrison was fired following a poor start to the 2025–26 season and enduring fan backlash to the Dončić trade.
